

419001–419100 

|-bgcolor=#E9E9E9
| 419001 ||  || — || July 29, 2009 || Kitt Peak || Spacewatch || — || align=right | 1.3 km || 
|-id=002 bgcolor=#E9E9E9
| 419002 ||  || — || July 24, 2000 || Kitt Peak || Spacewatch || — || align=right | 2.5 km || 
|-id=003 bgcolor=#E9E9E9
| 419003 ||  || — || July 31, 2009 || Kitt Peak || Spacewatch || — || align=right | 1.1 km || 
|-id=004 bgcolor=#E9E9E9
| 419004 ||  || — || August 12, 2009 || La Sagra || OAM Obs. || ADE || align=right | 2.2 km || 
|-id=005 bgcolor=#E9E9E9
| 419005 ||  || — || November 2, 2005 || Mount Lemmon || Mount Lemmon Survey || MRX || align=right | 1.2 km || 
|-id=006 bgcolor=#E9E9E9
| 419006 ||  || — || July 28, 2009 || Catalina || CSS || — || align=right | 2.3 km || 
|-id=007 bgcolor=#E9E9E9
| 419007 ||  || — || August 15, 2009 || Catalina || CSS || — || align=right | 1.1 km || 
|-id=008 bgcolor=#E9E9E9
| 419008 ||  || — || August 15, 2009 || Socorro || LINEAR || — || align=right | 1.8 km || 
|-id=009 bgcolor=#E9E9E9
| 419009 ||  || — || August 15, 2009 || Kitt Peak || Spacewatch || JUN || align=right | 1.3 km || 
|-id=010 bgcolor=#E9E9E9
| 419010 ||  || — || August 1, 2009 || Siding Spring || SSS || — || align=right | 1.6 km || 
|-id=011 bgcolor=#E9E9E9
| 419011 ||  || — || August 15, 2009 || La Sagra || OAM Obs. || ADE || align=right | 1.9 km || 
|-id=012 bgcolor=#E9E9E9
| 419012 ||  || — || August 15, 2009 || Kitt Peak || Spacewatch || — || align=right | 1.0 km || 
|-id=013 bgcolor=#E9E9E9
| 419013 ||  || — || July 14, 2009 || Kitt Peak || Spacewatch || ADE || align=right | 2.3 km || 
|-id=014 bgcolor=#fefefe
| 419014 ||  || — || August 17, 2009 || Farra d'Isonzo || Farra d'Isonzo || — || align=right | 1.5 km || 
|-id=015 bgcolor=#E9E9E9
| 419015 ||  || — || August 19, 2009 || Skylive Obs. || F. Tozzi || — || align=right | 2.2 km || 
|-id=016 bgcolor=#E9E9E9
| 419016 ||  || — || June 17, 2009 || Mount Lemmon || Mount Lemmon Survey || — || align=right | 1.4 km || 
|-id=017 bgcolor=#E9E9E9
| 419017 ||  || — || August 21, 2009 || Sandlot || G. Hug || DOR || align=right | 2.5 km || 
|-id=018 bgcolor=#E9E9E9
| 419018 ||  || — || October 24, 2005 || Kitt Peak || Spacewatch || — || align=right | 2.1 km || 
|-id=019 bgcolor=#E9E9E9
| 419019 ||  || — || August 16, 2009 || Kitt Peak || Spacewatch || — || align=right | 2.4 km || 
|-id=020 bgcolor=#E9E9E9
| 419020 ||  || — || August 20, 2009 || La Sagra || OAM Obs. || — || align=right | 2.6 km || 
|-id=021 bgcolor=#E9E9E9
| 419021 ||  || — || August 20, 2009 || La Sagra || OAM Obs. || ADE || align=right | 2.1 km || 
|-id=022 bgcolor=#FFC2E0
| 419022 ||  || — || August 26, 2009 || Catalina || CSS || AMO || align=right data-sort-value="0.74" | 740 m || 
|-id=023 bgcolor=#E9E9E9
| 419023 ||  || — || August 29, 2009 || Taunus || S. Karge, U. Zimmer || EUN || align=right | 1.3 km || 
|-id=024 bgcolor=#E9E9E9
| 419024 ||  || — || August 27, 2009 || Kitt Peak || Spacewatch || GEF || align=right | 1.2 km || 
|-id=025 bgcolor=#E9E9E9
| 419025 ||  || — || August 20, 2009 || Kitt Peak || Spacewatch || — || align=right | 1.1 km || 
|-id=026 bgcolor=#E9E9E9
| 419026 ||  || — || August 26, 2009 || La Sagra || OAM Obs. || — || align=right | 1.9 km || 
|-id=027 bgcolor=#E9E9E9
| 419027 ||  || — || August 28, 2009 || La Sagra || OAM Obs. || — || align=right | 2.9 km || 
|-id=028 bgcolor=#E9E9E9
| 419028 ||  || — || August 28, 2009 || La Sagra || OAM Obs. || — || align=right | 1.7 km || 
|-id=029 bgcolor=#d6d6d6
| 419029 ||  || — || August 19, 2009 || Kitt Peak || Spacewatch || — || align=right | 3.6 km || 
|-id=030 bgcolor=#E9E9E9
| 419030 ||  || — || August 28, 2009 || Catalina || CSS || — || align=right | 2.3 km || 
|-id=031 bgcolor=#E9E9E9
| 419031 ||  || — || August 17, 2009 || Catalina || CSS || — || align=right | 1.7 km || 
|-id=032 bgcolor=#E9E9E9
| 419032 ||  || — || August 28, 2009 || Kitt Peak || Spacewatch || — || align=right | 1.7 km || 
|-id=033 bgcolor=#E9E9E9
| 419033 ||  || — || May 27, 2009 || Catalina || CSS || — || align=right | 2.0 km || 
|-id=034 bgcolor=#E9E9E9
| 419034 ||  || — || August 20, 2009 || Kitt Peak || Spacewatch || — || align=right | 2.0 km || 
|-id=035 bgcolor=#d6d6d6
| 419035 ||  || — || August 16, 2009 || Kitt Peak || Spacewatch || EOS || align=right | 1.7 km || 
|-id=036 bgcolor=#E9E9E9
| 419036 ||  || — || August 19, 2009 || La Sagra || OAM Obs. || — || align=right | 1.9 km || 
|-id=037 bgcolor=#E9E9E9
| 419037 ||  || — || September 12, 2009 || Kitt Peak || Spacewatch || NEM || align=right | 2.1 km || 
|-id=038 bgcolor=#E9E9E9
| 419038 ||  || — || September 12, 2009 || Kitt Peak || Spacewatch || — || align=right | 2.0 km || 
|-id=039 bgcolor=#E9E9E9
| 419039 ||  || — || September 12, 2009 || Kitt Peak || Spacewatch || AGN || align=right | 1.1 km || 
|-id=040 bgcolor=#E9E9E9
| 419040 ||  || — || September 12, 2009 || Kitt Peak || Spacewatch || — || align=right | 2.5 km || 
|-id=041 bgcolor=#E9E9E9
| 419041 ||  || — || September 12, 2009 || Kitt Peak || Spacewatch || — || align=right | 1.4 km || 
|-id=042 bgcolor=#E9E9E9
| 419042 ||  || — || September 12, 2009 || Kitt Peak || Spacewatch || — || align=right | 2.0 km || 
|-id=043 bgcolor=#E9E9E9
| 419043 ||  || — || September 14, 2009 || Catalina || CSS || — || align=right | 2.0 km || 
|-id=044 bgcolor=#E9E9E9
| 419044 ||  || — || September 13, 2009 || XuYi || PMO NEO || — || align=right | 2.0 km || 
|-id=045 bgcolor=#E9E9E9
| 419045 ||  || — || September 13, 2009 || Purple Mountain || PMO NEO || — || align=right | 1.9 km || 
|-id=046 bgcolor=#E9E9E9
| 419046 ||  || — || August 25, 2009 || XuYi || PMO NEO || — || align=right | 2.2 km || 
|-id=047 bgcolor=#E9E9E9
| 419047 ||  || — || September 15, 2009 || Kitt Peak || Spacewatch || — || align=right | 1.7 km || 
|-id=048 bgcolor=#E9E9E9
| 419048 ||  || — || September 15, 2009 || Kitt Peak || Spacewatch || — || align=right | 1.6 km || 
|-id=049 bgcolor=#E9E9E9
| 419049 ||  || — || December 7, 2005 || Kitt Peak || Spacewatch || — || align=right | 2.7 km || 
|-id=050 bgcolor=#E9E9E9
| 419050 ||  || — || September 15, 2009 || Kitt Peak || Spacewatch || — || align=right | 2.3 km || 
|-id=051 bgcolor=#E9E9E9
| 419051 ||  || — || September 15, 2009 || Kitt Peak || Spacewatch || — || align=right | 1.7 km || 
|-id=052 bgcolor=#E9E9E9
| 419052 ||  || — || September 15, 2009 || Mount Lemmon || Mount Lemmon Survey || — || align=right | 2.9 km || 
|-id=053 bgcolor=#E9E9E9
| 419053 ||  || — || September 15, 2009 || Mount Lemmon || Mount Lemmon Survey || — || align=right | 1.8 km || 
|-id=054 bgcolor=#E9E9E9
| 419054 ||  || — || September 14, 2009 || Kitt Peak || Spacewatch || — || align=right | 1.7 km || 
|-id=055 bgcolor=#d6d6d6
| 419055 ||  || — || September 15, 2009 || Kitt Peak || Spacewatch || KOR || align=right | 1.1 km || 
|-id=056 bgcolor=#E9E9E9
| 419056 ||  || — || September 15, 2009 || Kitt Peak || Spacewatch || HOF || align=right | 2.6 km || 
|-id=057 bgcolor=#E9E9E9
| 419057 ||  || — || September 12, 2009 || Kitt Peak || Spacewatch || — || align=right | 2.0 km || 
|-id=058 bgcolor=#E9E9E9
| 419058 ||  || — || September 14, 2009 || Socorro || LINEAR || — || align=right | 1.9 km || 
|-id=059 bgcolor=#E9E9E9
| 419059 ||  || — || August 15, 2009 || Kitt Peak || Spacewatch || — || align=right | 1.4 km || 
|-id=060 bgcolor=#E9E9E9
| 419060 ||  || — || January 27, 2007 || Mount Lemmon || Mount Lemmon Survey || — || align=right | 2.2 km || 
|-id=061 bgcolor=#C2FFFF
| 419061 ||  || — || September 21, 2009 || Mount Lemmon || Mount Lemmon Survey || L5 || align=right | 9.6 km || 
|-id=062 bgcolor=#E9E9E9
| 419062 ||  || — || September 22, 2009 || Drebach || Drebach Obs. || — || align=right | 3.6 km || 
|-id=063 bgcolor=#E9E9E9
| 419063 ||  || — || September 17, 2009 || Catalina || CSS || — || align=right | 2.3 km || 
|-id=064 bgcolor=#E9E9E9
| 419064 ||  || — || September 16, 2009 || Kitt Peak || Spacewatch || — || align=right | 1.5 km || 
|-id=065 bgcolor=#E9E9E9
| 419065 ||  || — || September 16, 2009 || Kitt Peak || Spacewatch || EUN || align=right | 1.2 km || 
|-id=066 bgcolor=#E9E9E9
| 419066 ||  || — || September 16, 2009 || Kitt Peak || Spacewatch || MRX || align=right data-sort-value="0.99" | 990 m || 
|-id=067 bgcolor=#E9E9E9
| 419067 ||  || — || September 16, 2009 || Kitt Peak || Spacewatch || — || align=right | 2.6 km || 
|-id=068 bgcolor=#E9E9E9
| 419068 ||  || — || September 25, 2005 || Kitt Peak || Spacewatch || — || align=right | 1.4 km || 
|-id=069 bgcolor=#E9E9E9
| 419069 ||  || — || September 17, 2009 || Kitt Peak || Spacewatch || — || align=right | 1.6 km || 
|-id=070 bgcolor=#E9E9E9
| 419070 ||  || — || February 7, 2002 || Kitt Peak || Spacewatch || — || align=right | 1.9 km || 
|-id=071 bgcolor=#E9E9E9
| 419071 ||  || — || September 17, 2009 || Kitt Peak || Spacewatch || — || align=right | 1.9 km || 
|-id=072 bgcolor=#E9E9E9
| 419072 ||  || — || September 17, 2009 || Kitt Peak || Spacewatch || — || align=right | 1.8 km || 
|-id=073 bgcolor=#d6d6d6
| 419073 ||  || — || September 17, 2009 || Kitt Peak || Spacewatch || — || align=right | 2.7 km || 
|-id=074 bgcolor=#E9E9E9
| 419074 ||  || — || September 17, 2009 || Kitt Peak || Spacewatch || — || align=right | 2.4 km || 
|-id=075 bgcolor=#d6d6d6
| 419075 ||  || — || September 17, 2009 || Kitt Peak || Spacewatch || — || align=right | 3.4 km || 
|-id=076 bgcolor=#E9E9E9
| 419076 ||  || — || September 18, 2009 || Kitt Peak || Spacewatch || WIT || align=right data-sort-value="0.90" | 900 m || 
|-id=077 bgcolor=#E9E9E9
| 419077 ||  || — || April 13, 2008 || Mount Lemmon || Mount Lemmon Survey || — || align=right | 2.0 km || 
|-id=078 bgcolor=#E9E9E9
| 419078 ||  || — || August 16, 2009 || Kitt Peak || Spacewatch || MAR || align=right | 1.2 km || 
|-id=079 bgcolor=#E9E9E9
| 419079 ||  || — || August 17, 2009 || Kitt Peak || Spacewatch || — || align=right | 2.9 km || 
|-id=080 bgcolor=#E9E9E9
| 419080 ||  || — || September 18, 2009 || Kitt Peak || Spacewatch || — || align=right | 2.5 km || 
|-id=081 bgcolor=#E9E9E9
| 419081 ||  || — || September 18, 2009 || Kitt Peak || Spacewatch || — || align=right | 2.0 km || 
|-id=082 bgcolor=#E9E9E9
| 419082 ||  || — || September 18, 2009 || Kitt Peak || Spacewatch || — || align=right | 2.3 km || 
|-id=083 bgcolor=#E9E9E9
| 419083 ||  || — || September 18, 2009 || Kitt Peak || Spacewatch || — || align=right | 1.8 km || 
|-id=084 bgcolor=#E9E9E9
| 419084 ||  || — || September 18, 2009 || Kitt Peak || Spacewatch || — || align=right | 2.6 km || 
|-id=085 bgcolor=#E9E9E9
| 419085 ||  || — || September 18, 2009 || Kitt Peak || Spacewatch || — || align=right | 2.2 km || 
|-id=086 bgcolor=#E9E9E9
| 419086 ||  || — || September 18, 2009 || Catalina || CSS || — || align=right | 1.6 km || 
|-id=087 bgcolor=#E9E9E9
| 419087 ||  || — || September 18, 2009 || Kitt Peak || Spacewatch || HOF || align=right | 2.4 km || 
|-id=088 bgcolor=#E9E9E9
| 419088 ||  || — || September 18, 2009 || Kitt Peak || Spacewatch || — || align=right | 2.2 km || 
|-id=089 bgcolor=#d6d6d6
| 419089 ||  || — || September 18, 2009 || Kitt Peak || Spacewatch || TEL || align=right | 1.4 km || 
|-id=090 bgcolor=#E9E9E9
| 419090 ||  || — || April 25, 2003 || Kitt Peak || Spacewatch || — || align=right | 2.7 km || 
|-id=091 bgcolor=#d6d6d6
| 419091 ||  || — || September 19, 2009 || Kitt Peak || Spacewatch || — || align=right | 2.0 km || 
|-id=092 bgcolor=#E9E9E9
| 419092 ||  || — || August 28, 2009 || Kitt Peak || Spacewatch || — || align=right | 1.6 km || 
|-id=093 bgcolor=#d6d6d6
| 419093 ||  || — || September 19, 2009 || Kitt Peak || Spacewatch || — || align=right | 2.2 km || 
|-id=094 bgcolor=#E9E9E9
| 419094 ||  || — || September 19, 2009 || Mount Lemmon || Mount Lemmon Survey || JUN || align=right | 1.1 km || 
|-id=095 bgcolor=#E9E9E9
| 419095 ||  || — || September 20, 2009 || Kitt Peak || Spacewatch || — || align=right | 2.5 km || 
|-id=096 bgcolor=#E9E9E9
| 419096 ||  || — || September 20, 2009 || Kitt Peak || Spacewatch || — || align=right | 2.1 km || 
|-id=097 bgcolor=#E9E9E9
| 419097 ||  || — || September 25, 2005 || Kitt Peak || Spacewatch || — || align=right | 1.3 km || 
|-id=098 bgcolor=#d6d6d6
| 419098 ||  || — || September 20, 2009 || Kitt Peak || Spacewatch || — || align=right | 2.3 km || 
|-id=099 bgcolor=#E9E9E9
| 419099 ||  || — || September 20, 2009 || Kitt Peak || Spacewatch || — || align=right | 1.8 km || 
|-id=100 bgcolor=#E9E9E9
| 419100 ||  || — || September 20, 2009 || Kitt Peak || Spacewatch || PAD || align=right | 1.3 km || 
|}

419101–419200 

|-bgcolor=#E9E9E9
| 419101 ||  || — || September 20, 2009 || Mount Lemmon || Mount Lemmon Survey || — || align=right | 1.8 km || 
|-id=102 bgcolor=#E9E9E9
| 419102 ||  || — || November 6, 2005 || Mount Lemmon || Mount Lemmon Survey || — || align=right | 1.1 km || 
|-id=103 bgcolor=#E9E9E9
| 419103 ||  || — || September 23, 2009 || Mount Lemmon || Mount Lemmon Survey || — || align=right | 1.8 km || 
|-id=104 bgcolor=#E9E9E9
| 419104 ||  || — || September 28, 2009 || Wildberg || R. Apitzsch || — || align=right | 1.6 km || 
|-id=105 bgcolor=#d6d6d6
| 419105 ||  || — || September 18, 2009 || Kitt Peak || Spacewatch || — || align=right | 2.2 km || 
|-id=106 bgcolor=#E9E9E9
| 419106 ||  || — || October 30, 2006 || Mount Lemmon || Mount Lemmon Survey || — || align=right | 1.2 km || 
|-id=107 bgcolor=#E9E9E9
| 419107 ||  || — || September 16, 2009 || Kitt Peak || Spacewatch || — || align=right | 1.9 km || 
|-id=108 bgcolor=#E9E9E9
| 419108 ||  || — || September 17, 2009 || Kitt Peak || Spacewatch || — || align=right | 2.3 km || 
|-id=109 bgcolor=#E9E9E9
| 419109 ||  || — || September 21, 2009 || Kitt Peak || Spacewatch || — || align=right | 2.3 km || 
|-id=110 bgcolor=#E9E9E9
| 419110 ||  || — || September 21, 2009 || Kitt Peak || Spacewatch || PAD || align=right | 1.4 km || 
|-id=111 bgcolor=#E9E9E9
| 419111 ||  || — || September 21, 2009 || La Sagra || OAM Obs. || — || align=right | 3.4 km || 
|-id=112 bgcolor=#E9E9E9
| 419112 ||  || — || September 18, 1995 || Kitt Peak || Spacewatch || — || align=right | 2.0 km || 
|-id=113 bgcolor=#E9E9E9
| 419113 ||  || — || September 22, 2009 || Kitt Peak || Spacewatch || AGN || align=right | 1.3 km || 
|-id=114 bgcolor=#E9E9E9
| 419114 ||  || — || September 22, 2009 || Kitt Peak || Spacewatch || — || align=right | 1.6 km || 
|-id=115 bgcolor=#E9E9E9
| 419115 ||  || — || September 22, 2009 || Kitt Peak || Spacewatch || — || align=right | 2.5 km || 
|-id=116 bgcolor=#E9E9E9
| 419116 ||  || — || September 10, 2009 || Catalina || CSS || — || align=right | 2.4 km || 
|-id=117 bgcolor=#E9E9E9
| 419117 ||  || — || September 18, 2009 || Kitt Peak || Spacewatch || — || align=right | 1.9 km || 
|-id=118 bgcolor=#E9E9E9
| 419118 ||  || — || September 22, 2009 || Kitt Peak || Spacewatch || — || align=right | 1.7 km || 
|-id=119 bgcolor=#E9E9E9
| 419119 ||  || — || September 22, 2009 || Kitt Peak || Spacewatch || — || align=right | 1.7 km || 
|-id=120 bgcolor=#E9E9E9
| 419120 ||  || — || September 23, 2009 || Kitt Peak || Spacewatch || HOF || align=right | 2.4 km || 
|-id=121 bgcolor=#E9E9E9
| 419121 ||  || — || September 23, 2009 || Kitt Peak || Spacewatch || — || align=right | 2.1 km || 
|-id=122 bgcolor=#E9E9E9
| 419122 ||  || — || September 15, 2009 || Kitt Peak || Spacewatch || — || align=right | 2.4 km || 
|-id=123 bgcolor=#E9E9E9
| 419123 ||  || — || September 15, 2009 || Kitt Peak || Spacewatch || AST || align=right | 1.6 km || 
|-id=124 bgcolor=#d6d6d6
| 419124 ||  || — || September 24, 2009 || Kitt Peak || Spacewatch || — || align=right | 2.6 km || 
|-id=125 bgcolor=#E9E9E9
| 419125 ||  || — || September 18, 2009 || Kitt Peak || Spacewatch || AST || align=right | 1.7 km || 
|-id=126 bgcolor=#E9E9E9
| 419126 ||  || — || September 19, 2009 || Kitt Peak || Spacewatch || — || align=right | 2.4 km || 
|-id=127 bgcolor=#E9E9E9
| 419127 ||  || — || September 19, 2009 || Catalina || CSS || — || align=right | 1.8 km || 
|-id=128 bgcolor=#E9E9E9
| 419128 ||  || — || August 16, 2009 || Catalina || CSS || — || align=right | 2.5 km || 
|-id=129 bgcolor=#E9E9E9
| 419129 ||  || — || September 18, 2009 || Catalina || CSS || — || align=right | 2.6 km || 
|-id=130 bgcolor=#E9E9E9
| 419130 ||  || — || July 8, 2004 || Siding Spring || SSS || DOR || align=right | 2.5 km || 
|-id=131 bgcolor=#E9E9E9
| 419131 ||  || — || September 21, 2009 || La Sagra || OAM Obs. || — || align=right | 1.8 km || 
|-id=132 bgcolor=#E9E9E9
| 419132 ||  || — || September 19, 2009 || Kitt Peak || Spacewatch || — || align=right | 2.5 km || 
|-id=133 bgcolor=#E9E9E9
| 419133 ||  || — || September 17, 2009 || Kitt Peak || Spacewatch || EUN || align=right | 1.5 km || 
|-id=134 bgcolor=#E9E9E9
| 419134 ||  || — || September 19, 2009 || Kitt Peak || Spacewatch || — || align=right | 1.8 km || 
|-id=135 bgcolor=#E9E9E9
| 419135 ||  || — || September 23, 2009 || Mount Lemmon || Mount Lemmon Survey || DOR || align=right | 2.6 km || 
|-id=136 bgcolor=#E9E9E9
| 419136 ||  || — || September 23, 2009 || Mount Lemmon || Mount Lemmon Survey || — || align=right | 1.6 km || 
|-id=137 bgcolor=#d6d6d6
| 419137 ||  || — || September 17, 2004 || Kitt Peak || Spacewatch || — || align=right | 4.5 km || 
|-id=138 bgcolor=#E9E9E9
| 419138 ||  || — || September 12, 2009 || Kitt Peak || Spacewatch || — || align=right | 2.0 km || 
|-id=139 bgcolor=#d6d6d6
| 419139 ||  || — || September 17, 2009 || Kitt Peak || Spacewatch || — || align=right | 3.7 km || 
|-id=140 bgcolor=#E9E9E9
| 419140 ||  || — || September 17, 2009 || Kitt Peak || Spacewatch || — || align=right | 1.4 km || 
|-id=141 bgcolor=#E9E9E9
| 419141 ||  || — || September 17, 2009 || Kitt Peak || Spacewatch || — || align=right | 2.0 km || 
|-id=142 bgcolor=#E9E9E9
| 419142 ||  || — || September 25, 2009 || Kitt Peak || Spacewatch || — || align=right | 2.2 km || 
|-id=143 bgcolor=#E9E9E9
| 419143 ||  || — || September 25, 2009 || Kitt Peak || Spacewatch || — || align=right | 1.9 km || 
|-id=144 bgcolor=#E9E9E9
| 419144 ||  || — || September 25, 2009 || Kitt Peak || Spacewatch || — || align=right | 2.4 km || 
|-id=145 bgcolor=#E9E9E9
| 419145 ||  || — || December 29, 2005 || Mount Lemmon || Mount Lemmon Survey || AGN || align=right | 1.0 km || 
|-id=146 bgcolor=#d6d6d6
| 419146 ||  || — || September 27, 2009 || Kitt Peak || Spacewatch || — || align=right | 1.8 km || 
|-id=147 bgcolor=#E9E9E9
| 419147 ||  || — || September 15, 2009 || Kitt Peak || Spacewatch || NEM || align=right | 2.3 km || 
|-id=148 bgcolor=#E9E9E9
| 419148 ||  || — || August 15, 2009 || Kitt Peak || Spacewatch || — || align=right | 3.5 km || 
|-id=149 bgcolor=#E9E9E9
| 419149 ||  || — || February 6, 2002 || Kitt Peak || Spacewatch || AST || align=right | 1.5 km || 
|-id=150 bgcolor=#E9E9E9
| 419150 ||  || — || September 20, 2009 || Kitt Peak || Spacewatch || AGN || align=right | 1.2 km || 
|-id=151 bgcolor=#d6d6d6
| 419151 ||  || — || May 22, 2003 || Kitt Peak || Spacewatch || — || align=right | 2.3 km || 
|-id=152 bgcolor=#E9E9E9
| 419152 ||  || — || September 25, 2009 || Kitt Peak || Spacewatch || WIT || align=right data-sort-value="0.88" | 880 m || 
|-id=153 bgcolor=#E9E9E9
| 419153 ||  || — || September 16, 2009 || Catalina || CSS || — || align=right | 1.7 km || 
|-id=154 bgcolor=#d6d6d6
| 419154 ||  || — || September 20, 2009 || Kitt Peak || Spacewatch || — || align=right | 2.2 km || 
|-id=155 bgcolor=#E9E9E9
| 419155 ||  || — || September 25, 2009 || Catalina || CSS || — || align=right | 2.2 km || 
|-id=156 bgcolor=#E9E9E9
| 419156 ||  || — || September 27, 2009 || Catalina || CSS || — || align=right | 1.5 km || 
|-id=157 bgcolor=#E9E9E9
| 419157 ||  || — || September 27, 2009 || Siding Spring || SSS || (1547) || align=right | 1.9 km || 
|-id=158 bgcolor=#E9E9E9
| 419158 ||  || — || September 23, 2009 || Kitt Peak || Spacewatch || — || align=right | 1.5 km || 
|-id=159 bgcolor=#d6d6d6
| 419159 ||  || — || September 18, 2009 || Kitt Peak || Spacewatch || — || align=right | 3.5 km || 
|-id=160 bgcolor=#E9E9E9
| 419160 ||  || — || September 18, 2009 || Kitt Peak || Spacewatch || AGN || align=right | 1.1 km || 
|-id=161 bgcolor=#E9E9E9
| 419161 ||  || — || September 21, 2009 || Mount Lemmon || Mount Lemmon Survey || — || align=right | 2.5 km || 
|-id=162 bgcolor=#E9E9E9
| 419162 ||  || — || September 29, 2009 || Kitt Peak || Spacewatch || — || align=right | 1.9 km || 
|-id=163 bgcolor=#E9E9E9
| 419163 ||  || — || September 28, 2009 || Mount Lemmon || Mount Lemmon Survey || — || align=right | 3.7 km || 
|-id=164 bgcolor=#E9E9E9
| 419164 ||  || — || September 25, 2009 || Socorro || LINEAR || EUN || align=right | 1.9 km || 
|-id=165 bgcolor=#E9E9E9
| 419165 ||  || — || September 22, 2009 || Catalina || CSS || — || align=right | 1.8 km || 
|-id=166 bgcolor=#E9E9E9
| 419166 ||  || — || October 10, 2009 || La Sagra || OAM Obs. || — || align=right | 2.2 km || 
|-id=167 bgcolor=#E9E9E9
| 419167 ||  || — || October 11, 2009 || Mount Lemmon || Mount Lemmon Survey || — || align=right | 1.5 km || 
|-id=168 bgcolor=#E9E9E9
| 419168 ||  || — || October 11, 2009 || La Sagra || OAM Obs. || — || align=right | 2.2 km || 
|-id=169 bgcolor=#E9E9E9
| 419169 ||  || — || October 14, 2009 || Bisei SG Center || BATTeRS || — || align=right | 2.4 km || 
|-id=170 bgcolor=#fefefe
| 419170 ||  || — || October 14, 2009 || Bisei SG Center || BATTeRS || — || align=right data-sort-value="0.91" | 910 m || 
|-id=171 bgcolor=#E9E9E9
| 419171 ||  || — || September 22, 2009 || Catalina || CSS || — || align=right | 2.6 km || 
|-id=172 bgcolor=#E9E9E9
| 419172 ||  || — || October 14, 2009 || Catalina || CSS || — || align=right | 2.2 km || 
|-id=173 bgcolor=#E9E9E9
| 419173 ||  || — || April 23, 2007 || Mount Lemmon || Mount Lemmon Survey || JUN || align=right | 1.1 km || 
|-id=174 bgcolor=#E9E9E9
| 419174 ||  || — || October 15, 2009 || Mount Lemmon || Mount Lemmon Survey || — || align=right | 1.4 km || 
|-id=175 bgcolor=#d6d6d6
| 419175 ||  || — || October 14, 2009 || Catalina || CSS || NAE || align=right | 4.2 km || 
|-id=176 bgcolor=#E9E9E9
| 419176 ||  || — || October 12, 2009 || La Sagra || OAM Obs. || — || align=right | 2.8 km || 
|-id=177 bgcolor=#E9E9E9
| 419177 ||  || — || October 14, 2009 || La Sagra || OAM Obs. || — || align=right | 2.4 km || 
|-id=178 bgcolor=#E9E9E9
| 419178 ||  || — || October 9, 2009 || Catalina || CSS || DOR || align=right | 2.7 km || 
|-id=179 bgcolor=#E9E9E9
| 419179 ||  || — || October 15, 2009 || Catalina || CSS || — || align=right | 3.1 km || 
|-id=180 bgcolor=#E9E9E9
| 419180 ||  || — || December 1, 2005 || Kitt Peak || Spacewatch || — || align=right | 2.5 km || 
|-id=181 bgcolor=#E9E9E9
| 419181 ||  || — || October 15, 2009 || Catalina || CSS || — || align=right | 2.8 km || 
|-id=182 bgcolor=#d6d6d6
| 419182 ||  || — || October 12, 2009 || Mount Lemmon || Mount Lemmon Survey || — || align=right | 2.7 km || 
|-id=183 bgcolor=#d6d6d6
| 419183 ||  || — || October 1, 2009 || Mount Lemmon || Mount Lemmon Survey || — || align=right | 4.3 km || 
|-id=184 bgcolor=#d6d6d6
| 419184 ||  || — || October 14, 2009 || Catalina || CSS || — || align=right | 3.2 km || 
|-id=185 bgcolor=#d6d6d6
| 419185 ||  || — || August 18, 2009 || Catalina || CSS || — || align=right | 3.7 km || 
|-id=186 bgcolor=#d6d6d6
| 419186 ||  || — || October 16, 2009 || Catalina || CSS || — || align=right | 2.1 km || 
|-id=187 bgcolor=#d6d6d6
| 419187 ||  || — || October 18, 2009 || Mount Lemmon || Mount Lemmon Survey || — || align=right | 2.5 km || 
|-id=188 bgcolor=#E9E9E9
| 419188 ||  || — || August 25, 2004 || Kitt Peak || Spacewatch || — || align=right | 2.1 km || 
|-id=189 bgcolor=#d6d6d6
| 419189 ||  || — || October 22, 2009 || Mount Lemmon || Mount Lemmon Survey || KOR || align=right | 1.2 km || 
|-id=190 bgcolor=#E9E9E9
| 419190 ||  || — || October 18, 2009 || Mount Lemmon || Mount Lemmon Survey || — || align=right | 3.2 km || 
|-id=191 bgcolor=#E9E9E9
| 419191 ||  || — || October 18, 2009 || Mount Lemmon || Mount Lemmon Survey ||  || align=right | 2.6 km || 
|-id=192 bgcolor=#d6d6d6
| 419192 ||  || — || October 22, 2009 || Mount Lemmon || Mount Lemmon Survey || KOR || align=right | 1.2 km || 
|-id=193 bgcolor=#E9E9E9
| 419193 ||  || — || August 20, 2009 || Kitt Peak || Spacewatch || — || align=right | 2.1 km || 
|-id=194 bgcolor=#E9E9E9
| 419194 ||  || — || September 27, 2009 || Kitt Peak || Spacewatch || AGN || align=right | 1.5 km || 
|-id=195 bgcolor=#E9E9E9
| 419195 ||  || — || October 22, 2009 || Catalina || CSS || — || align=right | 1.8 km || 
|-id=196 bgcolor=#d6d6d6
| 419196 ||  || — || October 23, 2009 || Mount Lemmon || Mount Lemmon Survey || — || align=right | 2.3 km || 
|-id=197 bgcolor=#E9E9E9
| 419197 ||  || — || September 17, 2009 || Kitt Peak || Spacewatch || — || align=right | 2.9 km || 
|-id=198 bgcolor=#d6d6d6
| 419198 ||  || — || October 17, 2009 || Mount Lemmon || Mount Lemmon Survey || — || align=right | 2.8 km || 
|-id=199 bgcolor=#fefefe
| 419199 ||  || — || October 22, 2009 || Mount Lemmon || Mount Lemmon Survey || H || align=right data-sort-value="0.80" | 800 m || 
|-id=200 bgcolor=#E9E9E9
| 419200 ||  || — || September 29, 2009 || Mount Lemmon || Mount Lemmon Survey || — || align=right | 1.5 km || 
|}

419201–419300 

|-bgcolor=#E9E9E9
| 419201 ||  || — || October 23, 2009 || Mount Lemmon || Mount Lemmon Survey || — || align=right | 2.0 km || 
|-id=202 bgcolor=#E9E9E9
| 419202 ||  || — || October 23, 2009 || Mount Lemmon || Mount Lemmon Survey || — || align=right | 1.7 km || 
|-id=203 bgcolor=#E9E9E9
| 419203 ||  || — || October 16, 2009 || Catalina || CSS || EUN || align=right | 1.4 km || 
|-id=204 bgcolor=#d6d6d6
| 419204 ||  || — || October 22, 2009 || Mount Lemmon || Mount Lemmon Survey || KOR || align=right | 1.3 km || 
|-id=205 bgcolor=#E9E9E9
| 419205 ||  || — || October 23, 2009 || Kitt Peak || Spacewatch || — || align=right | 2.5 km || 
|-id=206 bgcolor=#E9E9E9
| 419206 ||  || — || January 6, 2006 || Catalina || CSS || — || align=right | 3.0 km || 
|-id=207 bgcolor=#d6d6d6
| 419207 ||  || — || October 24, 2009 || Kitt Peak || Spacewatch || — || align=right | 1.9 km || 
|-id=208 bgcolor=#d6d6d6
| 419208 ||  || — || September 17, 2009 || Catalina || CSS || — || align=right | 2.2 km || 
|-id=209 bgcolor=#E9E9E9
| 419209 ||  || — || October 23, 2009 || Kitt Peak || Spacewatch || DOR || align=right | 2.7 km || 
|-id=210 bgcolor=#E9E9E9
| 419210 ||  || — || October 22, 2009 || Catalina || CSS || — || align=right | 2.7 km || 
|-id=211 bgcolor=#E9E9E9
| 419211 ||  || — || October 21, 2009 || Mount Lemmon || Mount Lemmon Survey || NEM || align=right | 2.1 km || 
|-id=212 bgcolor=#d6d6d6
| 419212 ||  || — || October 14, 2009 || XuYi || PMO NEO || EOS || align=right | 4.1 km || 
|-id=213 bgcolor=#E9E9E9
| 419213 ||  || — || October 29, 2009 || La Sagra || OAM Obs. || — || align=right | 1.9 km || 
|-id=214 bgcolor=#E9E9E9
| 419214 ||  || — || October 16, 2009 || Catalina || CSS || — || align=right | 2.2 km || 
|-id=215 bgcolor=#E9E9E9
| 419215 ||  || — || October 22, 2009 || Mount Lemmon || Mount Lemmon Survey || HOF || align=right | 1.9 km || 
|-id=216 bgcolor=#E9E9E9
| 419216 ||  || — || August 6, 2004 || Zelenchukskaya || NEAT || — || align=right | 2.1 km || 
|-id=217 bgcolor=#E9E9E9
| 419217 ||  || — || December 2, 2005 || Kitt Peak || Spacewatch || — || align=right | 2.9 km || 
|-id=218 bgcolor=#d6d6d6
| 419218 ||  || — || October 26, 2009 || Mount Lemmon || Mount Lemmon Survey || — || align=right | 2.9 km || 
|-id=219 bgcolor=#d6d6d6
| 419219 ||  || — || October 27, 2009 || La Sagra || OAM Obs. || — || align=right | 3.5 km || 
|-id=220 bgcolor=#E9E9E9
| 419220 ||  || — || October 16, 2009 || Mount Lemmon || Mount Lemmon Survey || — || align=right | 1.9 km || 
|-id=221 bgcolor=#E9E9E9
| 419221 ||  || — || October 18, 2009 || Socorro || LINEAR || — || align=right | 4.0 km || 
|-id=222 bgcolor=#E9E9E9
| 419222 ||  || — || October 22, 2009 || Mount Lemmon || Mount Lemmon Survey || — || align=right | 2.7 km || 
|-id=223 bgcolor=#d6d6d6
| 419223 ||  || — || October 16, 2009 || Mount Lemmon || Mount Lemmon Survey || — || align=right | 2.4 km || 
|-id=224 bgcolor=#E9E9E9
| 419224 ||  || — || October 23, 2009 || Mount Lemmon || Mount Lemmon Survey || — || align=right | 1.2 km || 
|-id=225 bgcolor=#E9E9E9
| 419225 ||  || — || November 8, 2009 || Kitt Peak || Spacewatch || — || align=right | 2.1 km || 
|-id=226 bgcolor=#d6d6d6
| 419226 ||  || — || October 30, 2009 || Mount Lemmon || Mount Lemmon Survey || — || align=right | 3.4 km || 
|-id=227 bgcolor=#E9E9E9
| 419227 ||  || — || November 8, 2009 || Catalina || CSS || GEF || align=right | 1.4 km || 
|-id=228 bgcolor=#E9E9E9
| 419228 ||  || — || October 23, 2009 || Mount Lemmon || Mount Lemmon Survey || — || align=right | 1.9 km || 
|-id=229 bgcolor=#d6d6d6
| 419229 ||  || — || May 12, 2007 || Kitt Peak || Spacewatch || — || align=right | 2.7 km || 
|-id=230 bgcolor=#d6d6d6
| 419230 ||  || — || November 8, 2009 || Mount Lemmon || Mount Lemmon Survey || — || align=right | 2.6 km || 
|-id=231 bgcolor=#E9E9E9
| 419231 ||  || — || November 9, 2009 || Catalina || CSS || GEF || align=right | 3.0 km || 
|-id=232 bgcolor=#d6d6d6
| 419232 ||  || — || November 9, 2009 || Mount Lemmon || Mount Lemmon Survey || — || align=right | 2.3 km || 
|-id=233 bgcolor=#d6d6d6
| 419233 ||  || — || December 20, 2004 || Mount Lemmon || Mount Lemmon Survey || — || align=right | 2.7 km || 
|-id=234 bgcolor=#d6d6d6
| 419234 ||  || — || November 9, 2009 || Mount Lemmon || Mount Lemmon Survey || — || align=right | 4.1 km || 
|-id=235 bgcolor=#d6d6d6
| 419235 ||  || — || October 26, 2009 || Mount Lemmon || Mount Lemmon Survey || — || align=right | 3.0 km || 
|-id=236 bgcolor=#d6d6d6
| 419236 ||  || — || October 24, 2009 || Kitt Peak || Spacewatch || — || align=right | 4.0 km || 
|-id=237 bgcolor=#d6d6d6
| 419237 ||  || — || November 9, 2009 || Mount Lemmon || Mount Lemmon Survey || — || align=right | 2.1 km || 
|-id=238 bgcolor=#E9E9E9
| 419238 ||  || — || October 9, 2004 || Kitt Peak || Spacewatch || — || align=right | 2.2 km || 
|-id=239 bgcolor=#E9E9E9
| 419239 ||  || — || October 22, 2009 || Catalina || CSS || — || align=right | 2.2 km || 
|-id=240 bgcolor=#d6d6d6
| 419240 ||  || — || November 11, 2009 || Kitt Peak || Spacewatch || — || align=right | 3.3 km || 
|-id=241 bgcolor=#E9E9E9
| 419241 ||  || — || November 9, 2009 || Mount Lemmon || Mount Lemmon Survey || — || align=right | 2.0 km || 
|-id=242 bgcolor=#d6d6d6
| 419242 ||  || — || October 21, 2009 || Mount Lemmon || Mount Lemmon Survey || — || align=right | 3.1 km || 
|-id=243 bgcolor=#d6d6d6
| 419243 ||  || — || November 9, 2009 || Mount Lemmon || Mount Lemmon Survey || — || align=right | 3.5 km || 
|-id=244 bgcolor=#d6d6d6
| 419244 ||  || — || October 25, 2009 || Kitt Peak || Spacewatch || — || align=right | 2.7 km || 
|-id=245 bgcolor=#d6d6d6
| 419245 ||  || — || November 15, 2009 || La Sagra || OAM Obs. || — || align=right | 3.8 km || 
|-id=246 bgcolor=#E9E9E9
| 419246 ||  || — || October 24, 2009 || Kitt Peak || Spacewatch || AGN || align=right | 1.1 km || 
|-id=247 bgcolor=#d6d6d6
| 419247 ||  || — || October 14, 2009 || Mount Lemmon || Mount Lemmon Survey || — || align=right | 3.0 km || 
|-id=248 bgcolor=#d6d6d6
| 419248 ||  || — || November 8, 2009 || Kitt Peak || Spacewatch || — || align=right | 5.2 km || 
|-id=249 bgcolor=#d6d6d6
| 419249 ||  || — || September 20, 2009 || Mount Lemmon || Mount Lemmon Survey || — || align=right | 3.5 km || 
|-id=250 bgcolor=#d6d6d6
| 419250 ||  || — || November 8, 2009 || Kitt Peak || Spacewatch || — || align=right | 3.9 km || 
|-id=251 bgcolor=#d6d6d6
| 419251 ||  || — || November 8, 2009 || Mount Lemmon || Mount Lemmon Survey || — || align=right | 2.0 km || 
|-id=252 bgcolor=#d6d6d6
| 419252 ||  || — || October 16, 2009 || Mount Lemmon || Mount Lemmon Survey || BRA || align=right | 1.7 km || 
|-id=253 bgcolor=#E9E9E9
| 419253 ||  || — || April 14, 2007 || Kitt Peak || Spacewatch || — || align=right | 2.7 km || 
|-id=254 bgcolor=#E9E9E9
| 419254 ||  || — || November 9, 2009 || Mount Lemmon || Mount Lemmon Survey || — || align=right | 2.3 km || 
|-id=255 bgcolor=#d6d6d6
| 419255 ||  || — || November 9, 2009 || Catalina || CSS || — || align=right | 6.5 km || 
|-id=256 bgcolor=#d6d6d6
| 419256 ||  || — || October 24, 2009 || Kitt Peak || Spacewatch || BRA || align=right | 1.5 km || 
|-id=257 bgcolor=#d6d6d6
| 419257 ||  || — || October 5, 2003 || Kitt Peak || Spacewatch || THM || align=right | 1.7 km || 
|-id=258 bgcolor=#d6d6d6
| 419258 ||  || — || November 10, 2009 || Kitt Peak || Spacewatch || — || align=right | 3.1 km || 
|-id=259 bgcolor=#E9E9E9
| 419259 ||  || — || November 11, 2009 || Catalina || CSS || — || align=right | 2.4 km || 
|-id=260 bgcolor=#d6d6d6
| 419260 ||  || — || October 14, 2009 || Mount Lemmon || Mount Lemmon Survey || — || align=right | 2.6 km || 
|-id=261 bgcolor=#d6d6d6
| 419261 ||  || — || November 9, 2009 || Kitt Peak || Spacewatch || KOR || align=right | 1.4 km || 
|-id=262 bgcolor=#d6d6d6
| 419262 ||  || — || October 17, 2009 || Mount Lemmon || Mount Lemmon Survey || — || align=right | 3.1 km || 
|-id=263 bgcolor=#d6d6d6
| 419263 ||  || — || November 10, 2009 || Kitt Peak || Spacewatch || — || align=right | 3.8 km || 
|-id=264 bgcolor=#d6d6d6
| 419264 ||  || — || October 26, 2009 || Kitt Peak || Spacewatch || — || align=right | 2.2 km || 
|-id=265 bgcolor=#E9E9E9
| 419265 ||  || — || July 15, 2004 || Siding Spring || SSS || — || align=right | 2.7 km || 
|-id=266 bgcolor=#E9E9E9
| 419266 ||  || — || November 9, 2009 || Catalina || CSS || — || align=right | 2.2 km || 
|-id=267 bgcolor=#d6d6d6
| 419267 ||  || — || November 9, 2009 || Catalina || CSS || — || align=right | 3.4 km || 
|-id=268 bgcolor=#d6d6d6
| 419268 ||  || — || November 10, 2009 || Mount Lemmon || Mount Lemmon Survey || — || align=right | 4.3 km || 
|-id=269 bgcolor=#d6d6d6
| 419269 ||  || — || November 8, 2009 || Mount Lemmon || Mount Lemmon Survey || — || align=right | 2.6 km || 
|-id=270 bgcolor=#d6d6d6
| 419270 ||  || — || November 11, 2009 || Mount Lemmon || Mount Lemmon Survey || — || align=right | 3.0 km || 
|-id=271 bgcolor=#d6d6d6
| 419271 ||  || — || November 8, 2009 || Kitt Peak || Spacewatch || — || align=right | 2.5 km || 
|-id=272 bgcolor=#fefefe
| 419272 ||  || — || November 17, 2009 || Kitt Peak || Spacewatch || H || align=right data-sort-value="0.83" | 830 m || 
|-id=273 bgcolor=#d6d6d6
| 419273 ||  || — || October 23, 2009 || Mount Lemmon || Mount Lemmon Survey || EOS || align=right | 1.5 km || 
|-id=274 bgcolor=#fefefe
| 419274 ||  || — || March 10, 2007 || Mount Lemmon || Mount Lemmon Survey || NYS || align=right data-sort-value="0.66" | 660 m || 
|-id=275 bgcolor=#E9E9E9
| 419275 ||  || — || November 19, 2009 || Socorro || LINEAR || — || align=right | 3.7 km || 
|-id=276 bgcolor=#E9E9E9
| 419276 ||  || — || November 18, 2009 || Dauban || F. Kugel || DOR || align=right | 2.5 km || 
|-id=277 bgcolor=#d6d6d6
| 419277 ||  || — || September 22, 2009 || Mount Lemmon || Mount Lemmon Survey || KOR || align=right | 1.2 km || 
|-id=278 bgcolor=#d6d6d6
| 419278 ||  || — || October 22, 2009 || Mount Lemmon || Mount Lemmon Survey || KOR || align=right | 1.2 km || 
|-id=279 bgcolor=#d6d6d6
| 419279 ||  || — || October 22, 2009 || Mount Lemmon || Mount Lemmon Survey || — || align=right | 1.7 km || 
|-id=280 bgcolor=#d6d6d6
| 419280 ||  || — || February 1, 2006 || Kitt Peak || Spacewatch || KOR || align=right | 1.1 km || 
|-id=281 bgcolor=#d6d6d6
| 419281 ||  || — || November 16, 2009 || Mount Lemmon || Mount Lemmon Survey || — || align=right | 2.9 km || 
|-id=282 bgcolor=#d6d6d6
| 419282 ||  || — || November 16, 2009 || Mount Lemmon || Mount Lemmon Survey || — || align=right | 3.9 km || 
|-id=283 bgcolor=#d6d6d6
| 419283 ||  || — || October 12, 2009 || Mount Lemmon || Mount Lemmon Survey || — || align=right | 2.5 km || 
|-id=284 bgcolor=#d6d6d6
| 419284 ||  || — || November 18, 2009 || Kitt Peak || Spacewatch || — || align=right | 5.0 km || 
|-id=285 bgcolor=#d6d6d6
| 419285 ||  || — || November 16, 2009 || Tzec Maun || Tzec Maun Obs. || — || align=right | 2.3 km || 
|-id=286 bgcolor=#d6d6d6
| 419286 ||  || — || October 23, 2009 || Mount Lemmon || Mount Lemmon Survey || EOS || align=right | 2.2 km || 
|-id=287 bgcolor=#E9E9E9
| 419287 ||  || — || October 17, 2009 || Mount Lemmon || Mount Lemmon Survey || — || align=right | 2.2 km || 
|-id=288 bgcolor=#d6d6d6
| 419288 ||  || — || November 16, 2009 || Kitt Peak || Spacewatch || — || align=right | 2.5 km || 
|-id=289 bgcolor=#d6d6d6
| 419289 ||  || — || November 16, 2009 || Kitt Peak || Spacewatch || THM || align=right | 1.9 km || 
|-id=290 bgcolor=#d6d6d6
| 419290 ||  || — || November 16, 2009 || Kitt Peak || Spacewatch || — || align=right | 2.8 km || 
|-id=291 bgcolor=#d6d6d6
| 419291 ||  || — || November 29, 1999 || Kitt Peak || Spacewatch || — || align=right | 2.4 km || 
|-id=292 bgcolor=#d6d6d6
| 419292 ||  || — || November 8, 2009 || Kitt Peak || Spacewatch || — || align=right | 2.6 km || 
|-id=293 bgcolor=#d6d6d6
| 419293 ||  || — || November 16, 2009 || Kitt Peak || Spacewatch || — || align=right | 2.5 km || 
|-id=294 bgcolor=#d6d6d6
| 419294 ||  || — || November 16, 2009 || Kitt Peak || Spacewatch || EOS || align=right | 2.0 km || 
|-id=295 bgcolor=#E9E9E9
| 419295 ||  || — || September 19, 2009 || Kitt Peak || Spacewatch || — || align=right | 1.1 km || 
|-id=296 bgcolor=#d6d6d6
| 419296 ||  || — || November 17, 2009 || Kitt Peak || Spacewatch || KOR || align=right | 1.2 km || 
|-id=297 bgcolor=#d6d6d6
| 419297 ||  || — || November 8, 2009 || Mount Lemmon || Mount Lemmon Survey || KOR || align=right | 1.4 km || 
|-id=298 bgcolor=#d6d6d6
| 419298 ||  || — || November 17, 2009 || Kitt Peak || Spacewatch || — || align=right | 2.2 km || 
|-id=299 bgcolor=#E9E9E9
| 419299 ||  || — || November 17, 2009 || Catalina || CSS || — || align=right | 3.1 km || 
|-id=300 bgcolor=#d6d6d6
| 419300 ||  || — || October 24, 2009 || Mount Lemmon || Mount Lemmon Survey || — || align=right | 2.4 km || 
|}

419301–419400 

|-bgcolor=#d6d6d6
| 419301 ||  || — || November 18, 2009 || La Sagra || OAM Obs. || — || align=right | 2.8 km || 
|-id=302 bgcolor=#d6d6d6
| 419302 ||  || — || November 19, 2009 || Kitt Peak || Spacewatch || — || align=right | 1.7 km || 
|-id=303 bgcolor=#d6d6d6
| 419303 ||  || — || November 19, 2009 || Kitt Peak || Spacewatch || — || align=right | 3.0 km || 
|-id=304 bgcolor=#d6d6d6
| 419304 ||  || — || November 20, 2009 || Kitt Peak || Spacewatch || — || align=right | 2.8 km || 
|-id=305 bgcolor=#E9E9E9
| 419305 ||  || — || December 29, 2005 || Mount Lemmon || Mount Lemmon Survey || AGN || align=right | 1.4 km || 
|-id=306 bgcolor=#E9E9E9
| 419306 ||  || — || December 30, 2005 || Kitt Peak || Spacewatch || — || align=right | 2.0 km || 
|-id=307 bgcolor=#E9E9E9
| 419307 ||  || — || October 23, 2009 || Mount Lemmon || Mount Lemmon Survey || — || align=right | 2.6 km || 
|-id=308 bgcolor=#d6d6d6
| 419308 ||  || — || November 18, 2009 || Kitt Peak || Spacewatch || — || align=right | 2.4 km || 
|-id=309 bgcolor=#d6d6d6
| 419309 ||  || — || November 18, 2009 || Kitt Peak || Spacewatch || — || align=right | 2.3 km || 
|-id=310 bgcolor=#d6d6d6
| 419310 ||  || — || November 10, 2009 || Kitt Peak || Spacewatch || — || align=right | 3.6 km || 
|-id=311 bgcolor=#d6d6d6
| 419311 ||  || — || November 18, 2009 || Kitt Peak || Spacewatch || — || align=right | 3.1 km || 
|-id=312 bgcolor=#E9E9E9
| 419312 ||  || — || November 18, 2009 || Kitt Peak || Spacewatch || — || align=right | 1.9 km || 
|-id=313 bgcolor=#fefefe
| 419313 ||  || — || November 18, 2009 || Kitt Peak || Spacewatch || H || align=right data-sort-value="0.69" | 690 m || 
|-id=314 bgcolor=#E9E9E9
| 419314 ||  || — || November 19, 2009 || Kitt Peak || Spacewatch || — || align=right | 2.5 km || 
|-id=315 bgcolor=#d6d6d6
| 419315 ||  || — || November 9, 2009 || Mount Lemmon || Mount Lemmon Survey || — || align=right | 2.3 km || 
|-id=316 bgcolor=#d6d6d6
| 419316 ||  || — || November 19, 2009 || Kitt Peak || Spacewatch || — || align=right | 2.9 km || 
|-id=317 bgcolor=#d6d6d6
| 419317 ||  || — || November 19, 2009 || Kitt Peak || Spacewatch ||  || align=right | 2.6 km || 
|-id=318 bgcolor=#d6d6d6
| 419318 ||  || — || November 19, 2009 || Kitt Peak || Spacewatch || — || align=right | 2.7 km || 
|-id=319 bgcolor=#E9E9E9
| 419319 ||  || — || October 12, 2009 || Mount Lemmon || Mount Lemmon Survey || — || align=right | 2.3 km || 
|-id=320 bgcolor=#d6d6d6
| 419320 ||  || — || September 19, 2003 || Kitt Peak || Spacewatch || EOS || align=right | 2.6 km || 
|-id=321 bgcolor=#E9E9E9
| 419321 ||  || — || November 8, 2009 || Kitt Peak || Spacewatch || — || align=right | 1.2 km || 
|-id=322 bgcolor=#E9E9E9
| 419322 ||  || — || November 22, 2009 || Catalina || CSS || — || align=right | 2.6 km || 
|-id=323 bgcolor=#d6d6d6
| 419323 ||  || — || September 18, 2003 || Kitt Peak || Spacewatch || — || align=right | 3.1 km || 
|-id=324 bgcolor=#d6d6d6
| 419324 ||  || — || November 8, 2009 || Catalina || CSS || EOS || align=right | 2.4 km || 
|-id=325 bgcolor=#E9E9E9
| 419325 ||  || — || April 11, 2007 || Catalina || CSS || — || align=right | 2.2 km || 
|-id=326 bgcolor=#d6d6d6
| 419326 ||  || — || November 20, 2009 || Kitt Peak || Spacewatch || — || align=right | 3.0 km || 
|-id=327 bgcolor=#d6d6d6
| 419327 ||  || — || November 3, 2004 || Kitt Peak || Spacewatch || KOR || align=right | 1.1 km || 
|-id=328 bgcolor=#d6d6d6
| 419328 ||  || — || August 27, 2009 || Kitt Peak || Spacewatch || — || align=right | 2.5 km || 
|-id=329 bgcolor=#d6d6d6
| 419329 ||  || — || October 27, 2009 || Kitt Peak || Spacewatch || — || align=right | 2.3 km || 
|-id=330 bgcolor=#d6d6d6
| 419330 ||  || — || November 22, 2009 || Catalina || CSS || — || align=right | 3.0 km || 
|-id=331 bgcolor=#d6d6d6
| 419331 ||  || — || November 19, 2009 || Mount Lemmon || Mount Lemmon Survey || — || align=right | 4.9 km || 
|-id=332 bgcolor=#d6d6d6
| 419332 ||  || — || January 27, 2006 || Mount Lemmon || Mount Lemmon Survey || — || align=right | 2.2 km || 
|-id=333 bgcolor=#d6d6d6
| 419333 ||  || — || November 21, 2009 || Kitt Peak || Spacewatch || KOR || align=right | 1.3 km || 
|-id=334 bgcolor=#d6d6d6
| 419334 ||  || — || November 21, 2009 || Mount Lemmon || Mount Lemmon Survey || EOS || align=right | 3.0 km || 
|-id=335 bgcolor=#d6d6d6
| 419335 ||  || — || November 24, 2003 || Anderson Mesa || LONEOS || — || align=right | 3.8 km || 
|-id=336 bgcolor=#d6d6d6
| 419336 ||  || — || November 9, 2009 || Kitt Peak || Spacewatch || — || align=right | 2.9 km || 
|-id=337 bgcolor=#d6d6d6
| 419337 ||  || — || November 22, 2009 || Kitt Peak || Spacewatch || — || align=right | 4.8 km || 
|-id=338 bgcolor=#d6d6d6
| 419338 ||  || — || October 18, 2003 || Kitt Peak || Spacewatch || EOS || align=right | 2.1 km || 
|-id=339 bgcolor=#E9E9E9
| 419339 ||  || — || November 9, 2009 || Catalina || CSS || — || align=right | 1.8 km || 
|-id=340 bgcolor=#d6d6d6
| 419340 ||  || — || November 23, 2009 || Kitt Peak || Spacewatch || EOS || align=right | 2.1 km || 
|-id=341 bgcolor=#E9E9E9
| 419341 ||  || — || November 23, 2009 || Kitt Peak || Spacewatch || — || align=right | 2.3 km || 
|-id=342 bgcolor=#E9E9E9
| 419342 ||  || — || January 7, 2006 || Kitt Peak || Spacewatch || — || align=right | 2.6 km || 
|-id=343 bgcolor=#d6d6d6
| 419343 ||  || — || November 23, 2009 || Kitt Peak || Spacewatch || — || align=right | 5.1 km || 
|-id=344 bgcolor=#d6d6d6
| 419344 ||  || — || November 23, 2009 || Kitt Peak || Spacewatch || — || align=right | 3.1 km || 
|-id=345 bgcolor=#d6d6d6
| 419345 ||  || — || September 17, 2003 || Palomar || NEAT || — || align=right | 3.1 km || 
|-id=346 bgcolor=#E9E9E9
| 419346 ||  || — || November 24, 2009 || Mount Lemmon || Mount Lemmon Survey || — || align=right | 2.1 km || 
|-id=347 bgcolor=#d6d6d6
| 419347 ||  || — || November 24, 2009 || Mount Lemmon || Mount Lemmon Survey || — || align=right | 3.7 km || 
|-id=348 bgcolor=#d6d6d6
| 419348 ||  || — || October 3, 2003 || Kitt Peak || Spacewatch || — || align=right | 5.0 km || 
|-id=349 bgcolor=#E9E9E9
| 419349 ||  || — || November 26, 2009 || Mount Lemmon || Mount Lemmon Survey || — || align=right | 2.2 km || 
|-id=350 bgcolor=#d6d6d6
| 419350 ||  || — || November 26, 2009 || Mount Lemmon || Mount Lemmon Survey || EOS || align=right | 1.7 km || 
|-id=351 bgcolor=#d6d6d6
| 419351 ||  || — || October 26, 2009 || Mount Lemmon || Mount Lemmon Survey || — || align=right | 3.0 km || 
|-id=352 bgcolor=#d6d6d6
| 419352 ||  || — || November 17, 2009 || Kitt Peak || Spacewatch || — || align=right | 2.0 km || 
|-id=353 bgcolor=#d6d6d6
| 419353 ||  || — || November 9, 2009 || Kitt Peak || Spacewatch || — || align=right | 4.1 km || 
|-id=354 bgcolor=#d6d6d6
| 419354 ||  || — || September 15, 2009 || Kitt Peak || Spacewatch || — || align=right | 3.4 km || 
|-id=355 bgcolor=#d6d6d6
| 419355 ||  || — || December 25, 2005 || Mount Lemmon || Mount Lemmon Survey || KOR || align=right | 1.3 km || 
|-id=356 bgcolor=#E9E9E9
| 419356 ||  || — || November 22, 2000 || Kitt Peak || Spacewatch || — || align=right | 2.8 km || 
|-id=357 bgcolor=#d6d6d6
| 419357 ||  || — || November 17, 2009 || Kitt Peak || Spacewatch || — || align=right | 3.4 km || 
|-id=358 bgcolor=#d6d6d6
| 419358 ||  || — || November 17, 2009 || Kitt Peak || Spacewatch || — || align=right | 2.5 km || 
|-id=359 bgcolor=#d6d6d6
| 419359 ||  || — || November 9, 2009 || Mount Lemmon || Mount Lemmon Survey || EOS || align=right | 2.0 km || 
|-id=360 bgcolor=#d6d6d6
| 419360 ||  || — || August 28, 2009 || Kitt Peak || Spacewatch || EOS || align=right | 2.0 km || 
|-id=361 bgcolor=#d6d6d6
| 419361 ||  || — || November 21, 2009 || Kitt Peak || Spacewatch || KOR || align=right | 1.4 km || 
|-id=362 bgcolor=#d6d6d6
| 419362 ||  || — || November 21, 2009 || Mount Lemmon || Mount Lemmon Survey || — || align=right | 2.7 km || 
|-id=363 bgcolor=#d6d6d6
| 419363 ||  || — || November 25, 2009 || Mount Lemmon || Mount Lemmon Survey || — || align=right | 3.7 km || 
|-id=364 bgcolor=#d6d6d6
| 419364 ||  || — || November 16, 2009 || Mount Lemmon || Mount Lemmon Survey || — || align=right | 4.6 km || 
|-id=365 bgcolor=#d6d6d6
| 419365 ||  || — || December 10, 2009 || Mayhill || iTelescope Obs. || — || align=right | 2.4 km || 
|-id=366 bgcolor=#d6d6d6
| 419366 ||  || — || December 10, 2009 || Tzec Maun || Tzec Maun Obs. || — || align=right | 4.8 km || 
|-id=367 bgcolor=#d6d6d6
| 419367 ||  || — || December 9, 2009 || La Sagra || OAM Obs. || — || align=right | 3.6 km || 
|-id=368 bgcolor=#d6d6d6
| 419368 ||  || — || December 10, 2009 || Mount Lemmon || Mount Lemmon Survey || — || align=right | 3.7 km || 
|-id=369 bgcolor=#E9E9E9
| 419369 ||  || — || November 27, 2009 || Mount Lemmon || Mount Lemmon Survey || — || align=right | 2.3 km || 
|-id=370 bgcolor=#d6d6d6
| 419370 ||  || — || December 11, 1998 || Kitt Peak || Spacewatch || — || align=right | 3.1 km || 
|-id=371 bgcolor=#E9E9E9
| 419371 ||  || — || December 11, 2009 || Mount Lemmon || Mount Lemmon Survey || — || align=right | 2.1 km || 
|-id=372 bgcolor=#E9E9E9
| 419372 ||  || — || October 26, 2009 || Kitt Peak || Spacewatch || — || align=right | 3.9 km || 
|-id=373 bgcolor=#d6d6d6
| 419373 ||  || — || December 15, 2009 || Mount Lemmon || Mount Lemmon Survey || — || align=right | 5.0 km || 
|-id=374 bgcolor=#d6d6d6
| 419374 ||  || — || December 15, 2009 || Mount Lemmon || Mount Lemmon Survey || — || align=right | 4.3 km || 
|-id=375 bgcolor=#d6d6d6
| 419375 ||  || — || December 15, 2009 || Mount Lemmon || Mount Lemmon Survey || — || align=right | 2.9 km || 
|-id=376 bgcolor=#d6d6d6
| 419376 ||  || — || December 10, 2009 || Mount Lemmon || Mount Lemmon Survey || VER || align=right | 3.8 km || 
|-id=377 bgcolor=#E9E9E9
| 419377 ||  || — || December 17, 2009 || Mount Lemmon || Mount Lemmon Survey || — || align=right | 2.8 km || 
|-id=378 bgcolor=#E9E9E9
| 419378 ||  || — || December 17, 2009 || Mount Lemmon || Mount Lemmon Survey || — || align=right | 2.3 km || 
|-id=379 bgcolor=#d6d6d6
| 419379 ||  || — || November 19, 2009 || Mount Lemmon || Mount Lemmon Survey || — || align=right | 3.5 km || 
|-id=380 bgcolor=#d6d6d6
| 419380 ||  || — || December 17, 2009 || Mount Lemmon || Mount Lemmon Survey || — || align=right | 3.9 km || 
|-id=381 bgcolor=#E9E9E9
| 419381 ||  || — || December 18, 2009 || Mount Lemmon || Mount Lemmon Survey || — || align=right | 3.0 km || 
|-id=382 bgcolor=#d6d6d6
| 419382 ||  || — || December 18, 2009 || Mount Lemmon || Mount Lemmon Survey || EOS || align=right | 1.9 km || 
|-id=383 bgcolor=#d6d6d6
| 419383 ||  || — || December 18, 2009 || Mount Lemmon || Mount Lemmon Survey || — || align=right | 2.4 km || 
|-id=384 bgcolor=#d6d6d6
| 419384 ||  || — || December 18, 2009 || Mount Lemmon || Mount Lemmon Survey || EOS || align=right | 1.6 km || 
|-id=385 bgcolor=#d6d6d6
| 419385 ||  || — || November 11, 2009 || Mount Lemmon || Mount Lemmon Survey || — || align=right | 2.8 km || 
|-id=386 bgcolor=#d6d6d6
| 419386 ||  || — || December 27, 2009 || Kitt Peak || Spacewatch || VER || align=right | 3.7 km || 
|-id=387 bgcolor=#d6d6d6
| 419387 ||  || — || December 27, 2009 || Kitt Peak || Spacewatch || — || align=right | 3.0 km || 
|-id=388 bgcolor=#E9E9E9
| 419388 ||  || — || November 21, 2009 || Mount Lemmon || Mount Lemmon Survey || — || align=right | 2.1 km || 
|-id=389 bgcolor=#d6d6d6
| 419389 ||  || — || November 25, 2009 || Kitt Peak || Spacewatch || — || align=right | 5.0 km || 
|-id=390 bgcolor=#d6d6d6
| 419390 ||  || — || December 19, 2009 || Mount Lemmon || Mount Lemmon Survey || — || align=right | 2.8 km || 
|-id=391 bgcolor=#d6d6d6
| 419391 ||  || — || January 6, 2010 || Mount Lemmon || Mount Lemmon Survey || — || align=right | 4.2 km || 
|-id=392 bgcolor=#d6d6d6
| 419392 ||  || — || October 18, 2009 || Mount Lemmon || Mount Lemmon Survey || VER || align=right | 4.0 km || 
|-id=393 bgcolor=#d6d6d6
| 419393 ||  || — || January 7, 2010 || Kitt Peak || Spacewatch || — || align=right | 2.1 km || 
|-id=394 bgcolor=#d6d6d6
| 419394 ||  || — || January 6, 2010 || Kitt Peak || Spacewatch || THM || align=right | 2.4 km || 
|-id=395 bgcolor=#d6d6d6
| 419395 ||  || — || January 6, 2010 || Kitt Peak || Spacewatch || (3460) || align=right | 3.4 km || 
|-id=396 bgcolor=#d6d6d6
| 419396 ||  || — || December 18, 2009 || Mount Lemmon || Mount Lemmon Survey || — || align=right | 2.7 km || 
|-id=397 bgcolor=#d6d6d6
| 419397 ||  || — || January 6, 2010 || Kitt Peak || Spacewatch || — || align=right | 3.9 km || 
|-id=398 bgcolor=#d6d6d6
| 419398 ||  || — || January 7, 2010 || Kitt Peak || Spacewatch || VER || align=right | 3.7 km || 
|-id=399 bgcolor=#d6d6d6
| 419399 ||  || — || January 7, 2010 || Kitt Peak || Spacewatch || — || align=right | 4.3 km || 
|-id=400 bgcolor=#fefefe
| 419400 ||  || — || December 19, 2009 || Mount Lemmon || Mount Lemmon Survey || H || align=right data-sort-value="0.98" | 980 m || 
|}

419401–419500 

|-bgcolor=#fefefe
| 419401 ||  || — || January 8, 2010 || Kitt Peak || Spacewatch || H || align=right data-sort-value="0.83" | 830 m || 
|-id=402 bgcolor=#d6d6d6
| 419402 ||  || — || January 7, 2010 || Socorro || LINEAR || — || align=right | 3.6 km || 
|-id=403 bgcolor=#fefefe
| 419403 ||  || — || January 6, 2010 || Catalina || CSS || H || align=right data-sort-value="0.67" | 670 m || 
|-id=404 bgcolor=#d6d6d6
| 419404 ||  || — || January 7, 2010 || Kitt Peak || Spacewatch || — || align=right | 2.7 km || 
|-id=405 bgcolor=#d6d6d6
| 419405 ||  || — || January 8, 2010 || Kitt Peak || Spacewatch || EOS || align=right | 2.5 km || 
|-id=406 bgcolor=#d6d6d6
| 419406 ||  || — || January 8, 2010 || Kitt Peak || Spacewatch || — || align=right | 3.1 km || 
|-id=407 bgcolor=#d6d6d6
| 419407 ||  || — || September 29, 2009 || Mount Lemmon || Mount Lemmon Survey || Tj (2.99) || align=right | 3.8 km || 
|-id=408 bgcolor=#E9E9E9
| 419408 ||  || — || January 6, 2010 || Catalina || CSS || — || align=right | 2.0 km || 
|-id=409 bgcolor=#d6d6d6
| 419409 ||  || — || January 10, 2010 || Kitt Peak || Spacewatch || — || align=right | 5.6 km || 
|-id=410 bgcolor=#d6d6d6
| 419410 ||  || — || January 11, 2010 || Kitt Peak || Spacewatch || — || align=right | 2.8 km || 
|-id=411 bgcolor=#d6d6d6
| 419411 ||  || — || January 11, 2010 || Kitt Peak || Spacewatch || — || align=right | 2.9 km || 
|-id=412 bgcolor=#d6d6d6
| 419412 ||  || — || January 12, 2010 || Kitt Peak || Spacewatch || — || align=right | 3.3 km || 
|-id=413 bgcolor=#d6d6d6
| 419413 ||  || — || March 12, 2005 || Socorro || LINEAR || — || align=right | 4.1 km || 
|-id=414 bgcolor=#d6d6d6
| 419414 ||  || — || January 13, 2010 || Socorro || LINEAR || — || align=right | 5.1 km || 
|-id=415 bgcolor=#E9E9E9
| 419415 ||  || — || October 30, 2009 || Mount Lemmon || Mount Lemmon Survey || DOR || align=right | 3.5 km || 
|-id=416 bgcolor=#d6d6d6
| 419416 ||  || — || January 8, 2010 || Kitt Peak || Spacewatch || — || align=right | 3.3 km || 
|-id=417 bgcolor=#d6d6d6
| 419417 ||  || — || January 13, 2010 || Catalina || CSS || — || align=right | 2.9 km || 
|-id=418 bgcolor=#d6d6d6
| 419418 ||  || — || January 7, 2010 || Kitt Peak || Spacewatch || Tj (2.98) || align=right | 5.8 km || 
|-id=419 bgcolor=#d6d6d6
| 419419 ||  || — || January 12, 2010 || WISE || WISE || — || align=right | 3.9 km || 
|-id=420 bgcolor=#d6d6d6
| 419420 ||  || — || January 12, 2010 || WISE || WISE || — || align=right | 3.7 km || 
|-id=421 bgcolor=#E9E9E9
| 419421 ||  || — || December 27, 2005 || Kitt Peak || Spacewatch || — || align=right | 2.3 km || 
|-id=422 bgcolor=#d6d6d6
| 419422 ||  || — || January 16, 2010 || Bisei SG Center || BATTeRS || THM || align=right | 2.2 km || 
|-id=423 bgcolor=#d6d6d6
| 419423 ||  || — || January 19, 2010 || Črni Vrh || Črni Vrh || — || align=right | 5.3 km || 
|-id=424 bgcolor=#d6d6d6
| 419424 ||  || — || January 20, 2010 || Siding Spring || SSS || THB || align=right | 4.2 km || 
|-id=425 bgcolor=#d6d6d6
| 419425 ||  || — || January 20, 2010 || Siding Spring || SSS || — || align=right | 2.1 km || 
|-id=426 bgcolor=#d6d6d6
| 419426 ||  || — || January 16, 2010 || WISE || WISE || — || align=right | 4.7 km || 
|-id=427 bgcolor=#d6d6d6
| 419427 ||  || — || January 16, 2010 || WISE || WISE || — || align=right | 5.7 km || 
|-id=428 bgcolor=#E9E9E9
| 419428 ||  || — || October 24, 2009 || Kitt Peak || Spacewatch || — || align=right | 2.7 km || 
|-id=429 bgcolor=#E9E9E9
| 419429 ||  || — || October 21, 2009 || Catalina || CSS || — || align=right | 1.4 km || 
|-id=430 bgcolor=#d6d6d6
| 419430 ||  || — || February 8, 2010 || Kitt Peak || Spacewatch || — || align=right | 2.9 km || 
|-id=431 bgcolor=#d6d6d6
| 419431 ||  || — || February 10, 2010 || Kitt Peak || Spacewatch || — || align=right | 3.5 km || 
|-id=432 bgcolor=#d6d6d6
| 419432 ||  || — || March 8, 2005 || Mount Lemmon || Mount Lemmon Survey || HYG || align=right | 2.3 km || 
|-id=433 bgcolor=#fefefe
| 419433 ||  || — || February 10, 2010 || Kitt Peak || Spacewatch || H || align=right data-sort-value="0.90" | 900 m || 
|-id=434 bgcolor=#d6d6d6
| 419434 ||  || — || February 9, 2010 || Catalina || CSS || LIX || align=right | 3.8 km || 
|-id=435 bgcolor=#d6d6d6
| 419435 Tiramisu ||  ||  || February 14, 2010 || Nogales || J.-C. Merlin || — || align=right | 3.8 km || 
|-id=436 bgcolor=#d6d6d6
| 419436 ||  || — || February 13, 2010 || Socorro || LINEAR || — || align=right | 5.1 km || 
|-id=437 bgcolor=#d6d6d6
| 419437 ||  || — || February 13, 2010 || Socorro || LINEAR || — || align=right | 5.0 km || 
|-id=438 bgcolor=#d6d6d6
| 419438 ||  || — || September 23, 2008 || Catalina || CSS || — || align=right | 4.5 km || 
|-id=439 bgcolor=#E9E9E9
| 419439 ||  || — || January 13, 2005 || Kitt Peak || Spacewatch || — || align=right | 2.4 km || 
|-id=440 bgcolor=#d6d6d6
| 419440 ||  || — || February 13, 2010 || Catalina || CSS || — || align=right | 2.7 km || 
|-id=441 bgcolor=#d6d6d6
| 419441 ||  || — || February 13, 2010 || Kitt Peak || Spacewatch || SYL7:4 || align=right | 5.9 km || 
|-id=442 bgcolor=#fefefe
| 419442 ||  || — || February 13, 2010 || Kitt Peak || Spacewatch || H || align=right data-sort-value="0.77" | 770 m || 
|-id=443 bgcolor=#d6d6d6
| 419443 ||  || — || February 13, 2010 || Kitt Peak || Spacewatch || — || align=right | 3.4 km || 
|-id=444 bgcolor=#d6d6d6
| 419444 ||  || — || February 14, 2010 || Kitt Peak || Spacewatch || — || align=right | 5.1 km || 
|-id=445 bgcolor=#d6d6d6
| 419445 ||  || — || February 14, 2010 || Kitt Peak || Spacewatch || THM || align=right | 2.4 km || 
|-id=446 bgcolor=#d6d6d6
| 419446 ||  || — || February 14, 2010 || Mount Lemmon || Mount Lemmon Survey || 7:4 || align=right | 3.2 km || 
|-id=447 bgcolor=#d6d6d6
| 419447 ||  || — || February 15, 2010 || Kitt Peak || Spacewatch || THM || align=right | 2.2 km || 
|-id=448 bgcolor=#d6d6d6
| 419448 ||  || — || October 26, 2009 || Kitt Peak || Spacewatch || — || align=right | 3.5 km || 
|-id=449 bgcolor=#d6d6d6
| 419449 ||  || — || December 16, 2003 || Kitt Peak || Spacewatch || — || align=right | 3.4 km || 
|-id=450 bgcolor=#d6d6d6
| 419450 ||  || — || February 9, 2010 || Catalina || CSS || THB || align=right | 3.5 km || 
|-id=451 bgcolor=#d6d6d6
| 419451 ||  || — || February 11, 2010 || La Sagra || OAM Obs. || — || align=right | 3.3 km || 
|-id=452 bgcolor=#d6d6d6
| 419452 ||  || — || February 9, 2010 || Kitt Peak || Spacewatch || — || align=right | 2.9 km || 
|-id=453 bgcolor=#d6d6d6
| 419453 ||  || — || February 13, 2010 || Kitt Peak || Spacewatch || — || align=right | 4.0 km || 
|-id=454 bgcolor=#E9E9E9
| 419454 ||  || — || January 6, 2010 || Catalina || CSS || — || align=right | 3.4 km || 
|-id=455 bgcolor=#d6d6d6
| 419455 ||  || — || December 20, 2009 || Kitt Peak || Spacewatch || — || align=right | 3.8 km || 
|-id=456 bgcolor=#d6d6d6
| 419456 ||  || — || February 6, 2010 || Mount Lemmon || Mount Lemmon Survey || — || align=right | 3.7 km || 
|-id=457 bgcolor=#d6d6d6
| 419457 ||  || — || February 13, 2010 || Catalina || CSS || — || align=right | 4.9 km || 
|-id=458 bgcolor=#d6d6d6
| 419458 ||  || — || February 15, 2010 || Catalina || CSS || — || align=right | 3.1 km || 
|-id=459 bgcolor=#d6d6d6
| 419459 ||  || — || February 13, 2010 || Kitt Peak || Spacewatch || — || align=right | 2.2 km || 
|-id=460 bgcolor=#d6d6d6
| 419460 ||  || — || February 14, 2010 || Mount Lemmon || Mount Lemmon Survey || — || align=right | 2.4 km || 
|-id=461 bgcolor=#d6d6d6
| 419461 ||  || — || February 14, 2010 || Catalina || CSS || — || align=right | 4.1 km || 
|-id=462 bgcolor=#d6d6d6
| 419462 ||  || — || February 15, 2010 || Kitt Peak || Spacewatch || — || align=right | 3.1 km || 
|-id=463 bgcolor=#fefefe
| 419463 ||  || — || February 15, 2010 || Kitt Peak || Spacewatch || H || align=right data-sort-value="0.61" | 610 m || 
|-id=464 bgcolor=#FFC2E0
| 419464 ||  || — || February 12, 2010 || La Sagra || OAM Obs. || AMO || align=right data-sort-value="0.68" | 680 m || 
|-id=465 bgcolor=#d6d6d6
| 419465 ||  || — || February 15, 2010 || Catalina || CSS || — || align=right | 3.7 km || 
|-id=466 bgcolor=#d6d6d6
| 419466 ||  || — || February 14, 2010 || Haleakala || Pan-STARRS || — || align=right | 3.6 km || 
|-id=467 bgcolor=#d6d6d6
| 419467 ||  || — || August 10, 2007 || Kitt Peak || Spacewatch || — || align=right | 3.7 km || 
|-id=468 bgcolor=#d6d6d6
| 419468 ||  || — || November 18, 2008 || Catalina || CSS || — || align=right | 2.8 km || 
|-id=469 bgcolor=#d6d6d6
| 419469 ||  || — || February 15, 2010 || Catalina || CSS || — || align=right | 1.6 km || 
|-id=470 bgcolor=#d6d6d6
| 419470 ||  || — || February 15, 2010 || Socorro || LINEAR || — || align=right | 5.4 km || 
|-id=471 bgcolor=#E9E9E9
| 419471 ||  || — || September 30, 2009 || Mount Lemmon || Mount Lemmon Survey || — || align=right | 3.0 km || 
|-id=472 bgcolor=#FFC2E0
| 419472 ||  || — || February 17, 2010 || Socorro || LINEAR || APOPHA || align=right data-sort-value="0.46" | 460 m || 
|-id=473 bgcolor=#d6d6d6
| 419473 ||  || — || October 7, 2008 || Mount Lemmon || Mount Lemmon Survey || — || align=right | 3.0 km || 
|-id=474 bgcolor=#d6d6d6
| 419474 ||  || — || February 18, 2010 || WISE || WISE || — || align=right | 4.1 km || 
|-id=475 bgcolor=#d6d6d6
| 419475 ||  || — || March 20, 1999 || Apache Point || SDSS || — || align=right | 2.1 km || 
|-id=476 bgcolor=#d6d6d6
| 419476 ||  || — || February 17, 2010 || Mount Lemmon || Mount Lemmon Survey || — || align=right | 2.6 km || 
|-id=477 bgcolor=#d6d6d6
| 419477 ||  || — || February 17, 2010 || Mount Lemmon || Mount Lemmon Survey || EOS || align=right | 3.6 km || 
|-id=478 bgcolor=#d6d6d6
| 419478 ||  || — || February 17, 2010 || Kitt Peak || Spacewatch || — || align=right | 2.7 km || 
|-id=479 bgcolor=#d6d6d6
| 419479 ||  || — || February 19, 2010 || Mount Lemmon || Mount Lemmon Survey || — || align=right | 2.8 km || 
|-id=480 bgcolor=#d6d6d6
| 419480 ||  || — || February 21, 2010 || WISE || WISE || — || align=right | 3.0 km || 
|-id=481 bgcolor=#d6d6d6
| 419481 ||  || — || December 10, 2009 || Mount Lemmon || Mount Lemmon Survey || — || align=right | 4.6 km || 
|-id=482 bgcolor=#d6d6d6
| 419482 ||  || — || December 13, 2009 || Mount Lemmon || Mount Lemmon Survey || — || align=right | 4.5 km || 
|-id=483 bgcolor=#d6d6d6
| 419483 ||  || — || February 17, 2010 || Kitt Peak || Spacewatch || — || align=right | 5.1 km || 
|-id=484 bgcolor=#d6d6d6
| 419484 ||  || — || May 8, 2006 || Mount Lemmon || Mount Lemmon Survey || — || align=right | 4.2 km || 
|-id=485 bgcolor=#d6d6d6
| 419485 ||  || — || July 30, 2008 || Kitt Peak || Spacewatch || — || align=right | 4.1 km || 
|-id=486 bgcolor=#E9E9E9
| 419486 ||  || — || March 6, 2010 || WISE || WISE || — || align=right | 3.2 km || 
|-id=487 bgcolor=#d6d6d6
| 419487 ||  || — || March 4, 2010 || Kitt Peak || Spacewatch || — || align=right | 2.2 km || 
|-id=488 bgcolor=#d6d6d6
| 419488 ||  || — || March 5, 2010 || Catalina || CSS || THB || align=right | 3.1 km || 
|-id=489 bgcolor=#d6d6d6
| 419489 ||  || — || December 20, 2009 || Kitt Peak || Spacewatch || URS || align=right | 5.0 km || 
|-id=490 bgcolor=#d6d6d6
| 419490 ||  || — || March 12, 2010 || Dauban || F. Kugel || — || align=right | 3.8 km || 
|-id=491 bgcolor=#fefefe
| 419491 ||  || — || March 14, 2010 || Catalina || CSS || H || align=right data-sort-value="0.81" | 810 m || 
|-id=492 bgcolor=#d6d6d6
| 419492 ||  || — || March 12, 2010 || Kitt Peak || Spacewatch || — || align=right | 3.1 km || 
|-id=493 bgcolor=#d6d6d6
| 419493 ||  || — || March 5, 2010 || Catalina || CSS || — || align=right | 2.0 km || 
|-id=494 bgcolor=#d6d6d6
| 419494 ||  || — || March 13, 2010 || Kitt Peak || Spacewatch || — || align=right | 4.0 km || 
|-id=495 bgcolor=#d6d6d6
| 419495 ||  || — || March 12, 2010 || Kitt Peak || Spacewatch || — || align=right | 5.6 km || 
|-id=496 bgcolor=#d6d6d6
| 419496 ||  || — || March 12, 2010 || Mount Lemmon || Mount Lemmon Survey || — || align=right | 3.3 km || 
|-id=497 bgcolor=#fefefe
| 419497 ||  || — || March 13, 2010 || Catalina || CSS || H || align=right data-sort-value="0.62" | 620 m || 
|-id=498 bgcolor=#d6d6d6
| 419498 ||  || — || March 15, 2010 || La Sagra || OAM Obs. || — || align=right | 3.2 km || 
|-id=499 bgcolor=#d6d6d6
| 419499 ||  || — || March 14, 2010 || Catalina || CSS || — || align=right | 4.7 km || 
|-id=500 bgcolor=#d6d6d6
| 419500 ||  || — || March 15, 2010 || Catalina || CSS || EOS || align=right | 3.2 km || 
|}

419501–419600 

|-bgcolor=#d6d6d6
| 419501 ||  || — || October 11, 2007 || Kitt Peak || Spacewatch || — || align=right | 3.3 km || 
|-id=502 bgcolor=#d6d6d6
| 419502 ||  || — || March 20, 2010 || Catalina || CSS || — || align=right | 3.8 km || 
|-id=503 bgcolor=#d6d6d6
| 419503 ||  || — || March 19, 2010 || Kitt Peak || Spacewatch || — || align=right | 3.2 km || 
|-id=504 bgcolor=#d6d6d6
| 419504 ||  || — || March 19, 2010 || Catalina || CSS || — || align=right | 4.6 km || 
|-id=505 bgcolor=#d6d6d6
| 419505 ||  || — || March 18, 2010 || Mount Lemmon || Mount Lemmon Survey || — || align=right | 2.7 km || 
|-id=506 bgcolor=#d6d6d6
| 419506 ||  || — || April 2, 2010 || WISE || WISE || VER || align=right | 3.6 km || 
|-id=507 bgcolor=#d6d6d6
| 419507 ||  || — || April 5, 2010 || Bergisch Gladbach || W. Bickel || — || align=right | 3.2 km || 
|-id=508 bgcolor=#d6d6d6
| 419508 ||  || — || April 12, 2010 || Socorro || LINEAR || Tj (2.94) || align=right | 3.5 km || 
|-id=509 bgcolor=#d6d6d6
| 419509 ||  || — || April 6, 2010 || Mount Lemmon || Mount Lemmon Survey || — || align=right | 2.2 km || 
|-id=510 bgcolor=#d6d6d6
| 419510 ||  || — || December 31, 2008 || Catalina || CSS || EOS || align=right | 2.4 km || 
|-id=511 bgcolor=#fefefe
| 419511 ||  || — || April 10, 2010 || Mount Lemmon || Mount Lemmon Survey || — || align=right data-sort-value="0.72" | 720 m || 
|-id=512 bgcolor=#d6d6d6
| 419512 ||  || — || March 17, 2010 || Catalina || CSS || — || align=right | 2.1 km || 
|-id=513 bgcolor=#d6d6d6
| 419513 ||  || — || October 27, 2008 || Kitt Peak || Spacewatch || — || align=right | 4.4 km || 
|-id=514 bgcolor=#d6d6d6
| 419514 ||  || — || December 21, 2008 || Socorro || LINEAR || EOS || align=right | 2.7 km || 
|-id=515 bgcolor=#C2FFFF
| 419515 ||  || — || April 17, 2010 || WISE || WISE || L5 || align=right | 13 km || 
|-id=516 bgcolor=#d6d6d6
| 419516 ||  || — || April 18, 2010 || WISE || WISE || — || align=right | 4.5 km || 
|-id=517 bgcolor=#C2FFFF
| 419517 ||  || — || April 25, 2010 || WISE || WISE || L5 || align=right | 13 km || 
|-id=518 bgcolor=#d6d6d6
| 419518 ||  || — || April 19, 2010 || WISE || WISE || — || align=right | 3.5 km || 
|-id=519 bgcolor=#fefefe
| 419519 ||  || — || April 30, 2010 || WISE || WISE || — || align=right | 1.2 km || 
|-id=520 bgcolor=#FA8072
| 419520 ||  || — || May 5, 2010 || Catalina || CSS || H || align=right data-sort-value="0.93" | 930 m || 
|-id=521 bgcolor=#fefefe
| 419521 Meursault ||  ||  || May 7, 2010 || Sierra Stars || M. Ory || — || align=right data-sort-value="0.68" | 680 m || 
|-id=522 bgcolor=#fefefe
| 419522 ||  || — || October 7, 2005 || Mount Lemmon || Mount Lemmon Survey || — || align=right data-sort-value="0.58" | 580 m || 
|-id=523 bgcolor=#d6d6d6
| 419523 ||  || — || May 8, 2010 || WISE || WISE || — || align=right | 3.5 km || 
|-id=524 bgcolor=#C2FFFF
| 419524 ||  || — || May 10, 2010 || WISE || WISE || L5 || align=right | 8.1 km || 
|-id=525 bgcolor=#fefefe
| 419525 ||  || — || April 10, 2010 || Kitt Peak || Spacewatch || — || align=right data-sort-value="0.78" | 780 m || 
|-id=526 bgcolor=#fefefe
| 419526 ||  || — || May 13, 2010 || WISE || WISE || — || align=right | 1.8 km || 
|-id=527 bgcolor=#d6d6d6
| 419527 ||  || — || May 16, 2010 || WISE || WISE || — || align=right | 4.3 km || 
|-id=528 bgcolor=#d6d6d6
| 419528 ||  || — || July 26, 1995 || Kitt Peak || Spacewatch || — || align=right | 4.4 km || 
|-id=529 bgcolor=#fefefe
| 419529 ||  || — || May 25, 2010 || WISE || WISE || — || align=right | 2.3 km || 
|-id=530 bgcolor=#d6d6d6
| 419530 ||  || — || May 25, 2010 || WISE || WISE || — || align=right | 2.7 km || 
|-id=531 bgcolor=#fefefe
| 419531 ||  || — || May 27, 2010 || WISE || WISE || — || align=right | 1.7 km || 
|-id=532 bgcolor=#fefefe
| 419532 ||  || — || May 27, 2010 || WISE || WISE || — || align=right | 1.5 km || 
|-id=533 bgcolor=#d6d6d6
| 419533 ||  || — || May 29, 2010 || WISE || WISE || — || align=right | 5.2 km || 
|-id=534 bgcolor=#FA8072
| 419534 ||  || — || May 17, 2010 || La Sagra || OAM Obs. || — || align=right data-sort-value="0.80" | 800 m || 
|-id=535 bgcolor=#fefefe
| 419535 ||  || — || June 1, 2010 || WISE || WISE || — || align=right | 1.1 km || 
|-id=536 bgcolor=#fefefe
| 419536 ||  || — || June 11, 2010 || WISE || WISE || — || align=right | 1.5 km || 
|-id=537 bgcolor=#fefefe
| 419537 ||  || — || June 16, 2010 || WISE || WISE || — || align=right | 1.9 km || 
|-id=538 bgcolor=#d6d6d6
| 419538 ||  || — || June 17, 2010 || WISE || WISE || — || align=right | 3.3 km || 
|-id=539 bgcolor=#fefefe
| 419539 ||  || — || June 25, 2010 || WISE || WISE || NYS || align=right | 1.5 km || 
|-id=540 bgcolor=#fefefe
| 419540 ||  || — || June 18, 2010 || Mount Lemmon || Mount Lemmon Survey || MAS || align=right data-sort-value="0.75" | 750 m || 
|-id=541 bgcolor=#fefefe
| 419541 ||  || — || June 20, 2010 || Mount Lemmon || Mount Lemmon Survey || — || align=right | 1.0 km || 
|-id=542 bgcolor=#fefefe
| 419542 ||  || — || July 6, 2010 || WISE || WISE || — || align=right | 1.4 km || 
|-id=543 bgcolor=#d6d6d6
| 419543 ||  || — || July 16, 2010 || WISE || WISE || — || align=right | 3.1 km || 
|-id=544 bgcolor=#E9E9E9
| 419544 ||  || — || July 20, 2010 || WISE || WISE || EUN || align=right | 1.8 km || 
|-id=545 bgcolor=#fefefe
| 419545 ||  || — || December 18, 2003 || Socorro || LINEAR || — || align=right | 2.0 km || 
|-id=546 bgcolor=#d6d6d6
| 419546 ||  || — || February 2, 2009 || Kitt Peak || Spacewatch || — || align=right | 4.6 km || 
|-id=547 bgcolor=#d6d6d6
| 419547 ||  || — || January 18, 2009 || Catalina || CSS || — || align=right | 4.3 km || 
|-id=548 bgcolor=#E9E9E9
| 419548 ||  || — || October 4, 2006 || Mount Lemmon || Mount Lemmon Survey || — || align=right | 2.1 km || 
|-id=549 bgcolor=#d6d6d6
| 419549 ||  || — || July 26, 2010 || WISE || WISE || — || align=right | 4.1 km || 
|-id=550 bgcolor=#E9E9E9
| 419550 ||  || — || July 27, 2010 || WISE || WISE || — || align=right | 1.9 km || 
|-id=551 bgcolor=#E9E9E9
| 419551 ||  || — || July 29, 2010 || WISE || WISE || ADE || align=right | 2.0 km || 
|-id=552 bgcolor=#E9E9E9
| 419552 ||  || — || July 30, 2010 || WISE || WISE || — || align=right | 1.8 km || 
|-id=553 bgcolor=#fefefe
| 419553 ||  || — || August 7, 2010 || Purple Mountain || PMO NEO || — || align=right data-sort-value="0.81" | 810 m || 
|-id=554 bgcolor=#E9E9E9
| 419554 ||  || — || August 8, 2010 || WISE || WISE || (194) || align=right | 2.3 km || 
|-id=555 bgcolor=#fefefe
| 419555 ||  || — || February 27, 2006 || Kitt Peak || Spacewatch || — || align=right data-sort-value="0.94" | 940 m || 
|-id=556 bgcolor=#fefefe
| 419556 ||  || — || August 7, 2010 || La Sagra || OAM Obs. || MAS || align=right data-sort-value="0.60" | 600 m || 
|-id=557 bgcolor=#fefefe
| 419557 ||  || — || August 12, 2010 || Kitt Peak || Spacewatch || MAS || align=right data-sort-value="0.66" | 660 m || 
|-id=558 bgcolor=#fefefe
| 419558 ||  || — || June 21, 2010 || Mount Lemmon || Mount Lemmon Survey || — || align=right data-sort-value="0.98" | 980 m || 
|-id=559 bgcolor=#fefefe
| 419559 ||  || — || August 16, 2010 || La Sagra || OAM Obs. || NYS || align=right data-sort-value="0.63" | 630 m || 
|-id=560 bgcolor=#fefefe
| 419560 ||  || — || February 9, 2005 || Kitt Peak || Spacewatch || — || align=right data-sort-value="0.87" | 870 m || 
|-id=561 bgcolor=#fefefe
| 419561 ||  || — || November 23, 2003 || Kitt Peak || Spacewatch || NYS || align=right data-sort-value="0.63" | 630 m || 
|-id=562 bgcolor=#fefefe
| 419562 ||  || — || September 1, 2010 || ESA OGS || ESA OGS || — || align=right data-sort-value="0.89" | 890 m || 
|-id=563 bgcolor=#fefefe
| 419563 ||  || — || September 2, 2010 || Mount Lemmon || Mount Lemmon Survey || — || align=right data-sort-value="0.97" | 970 m || 
|-id=564 bgcolor=#fefefe
| 419564 ||  || — || September 2, 2010 || Socorro || LINEAR || — || align=right data-sort-value="0.79" | 790 m || 
|-id=565 bgcolor=#fefefe
| 419565 ||  || — || September 2, 2010 || Mount Lemmon || Mount Lemmon Survey || — || align=right data-sort-value="0.87" | 870 m || 
|-id=566 bgcolor=#fefefe
| 419566 ||  || — || September 1, 2010 || Socorro || LINEAR || — || align=right data-sort-value="0.76" | 760 m || 
|-id=567 bgcolor=#fefefe
| 419567 ||  || — || February 7, 2008 || Mount Lemmon || Mount Lemmon Survey || — || align=right data-sort-value="0.94" | 940 m || 
|-id=568 bgcolor=#fefefe
| 419568 ||  || — || September 4, 2010 || Kitt Peak || Spacewatch || — || align=right data-sort-value="0.94" | 940 m || 
|-id=569 bgcolor=#fefefe
| 419569 ||  || — || January 11, 2008 || Kitt Peak || Spacewatch || — || align=right data-sort-value="0.70" | 700 m || 
|-id=570 bgcolor=#fefefe
| 419570 ||  || — || October 4, 1999 || Kitt Peak || Spacewatch || — || align=right data-sort-value="0.65" | 650 m || 
|-id=571 bgcolor=#fefefe
| 419571 ||  || — || September 4, 2010 || Kitt Peak || Spacewatch || MAS || align=right data-sort-value="0.64" | 640 m || 
|-id=572 bgcolor=#fefefe
| 419572 ||  || — || September 4, 2010 || Kitt Peak || Spacewatch || NYS || align=right data-sort-value="0.54" | 540 m || 
|-id=573 bgcolor=#fefefe
| 419573 ||  || — || September 4, 2010 || Kitt Peak || Spacewatch || — || align=right data-sort-value="0.72" | 720 m || 
|-id=574 bgcolor=#fefefe
| 419574 ||  || — || September 6, 2010 || Socorro || LINEAR || — || align=right data-sort-value="0.93" | 930 m || 
|-id=575 bgcolor=#fefefe
| 419575 ||  || — || November 19, 2007 || Mount Lemmon || Mount Lemmon Survey || — || align=right data-sort-value="0.98" | 980 m || 
|-id=576 bgcolor=#fefefe
| 419576 ||  || — || March 8, 2009 || Mount Lemmon || Mount Lemmon Survey || V || align=right data-sort-value="0.61" | 610 m || 
|-id=577 bgcolor=#fefefe
| 419577 ||  || — || October 13, 1999 || Apache Point || SDSS || — || align=right data-sort-value="0.87" | 870 m || 
|-id=578 bgcolor=#E9E9E9
| 419578 ||  || — || September 5, 2010 || Mount Lemmon || Mount Lemmon Survey || (5) || align=right data-sort-value="0.72" | 720 m || 
|-id=579 bgcolor=#fefefe
| 419579 ||  || — || September 14, 1999 || Kitt Peak || Spacewatch || NYS || align=right data-sort-value="0.60" | 600 m || 
|-id=580 bgcolor=#fefefe
| 419580 ||  || — || January 30, 2008 || Mount Lemmon || Mount Lemmon Survey || — || align=right data-sort-value="0.75" | 750 m || 
|-id=581 bgcolor=#fefefe
| 419581 ||  || — || November 29, 1999 || Kitt Peak || Spacewatch || — || align=right data-sort-value="0.69" | 690 m || 
|-id=582 bgcolor=#fefefe
| 419582 ||  || — || April 12, 2005 || Kitt Peak || M. W. Buie || V || align=right data-sort-value="0.66" | 660 m || 
|-id=583 bgcolor=#fefefe
| 419583 ||  || — || November 18, 2003 || Palomar || NEAT || — || align=right data-sort-value="0.83" | 830 m || 
|-id=584 bgcolor=#fefefe
| 419584 ||  || — || September 19, 2003 || Kitt Peak || Spacewatch || — || align=right data-sort-value="0.63" | 630 m || 
|-id=585 bgcolor=#fefefe
| 419585 ||  || — || September 2, 2010 || Mount Lemmon || Mount Lemmon Survey || — || align=right data-sort-value="0.88" | 880 m || 
|-id=586 bgcolor=#fefefe
| 419586 ||  || — || February 11, 2008 || Mount Lemmon || Mount Lemmon Survey || — || align=right data-sort-value="0.76" | 760 m || 
|-id=587 bgcolor=#fefefe
| 419587 ||  || — || April 28, 2009 || Mount Lemmon || Mount Lemmon Survey || — || align=right data-sort-value="0.83" | 830 m || 
|-id=588 bgcolor=#fefefe
| 419588 ||  || — || September 10, 2010 || Kitt Peak || Spacewatch || NYS || align=right data-sort-value="0.66" | 660 m || 
|-id=589 bgcolor=#fefefe
| 419589 ||  || — || September 10, 2010 || Kitt Peak || Spacewatch || — || align=right data-sort-value="0.86" | 860 m || 
|-id=590 bgcolor=#fefefe
| 419590 ||  || — || February 12, 2008 || Kitt Peak || Spacewatch || NYS || align=right data-sort-value="0.62" | 620 m || 
|-id=591 bgcolor=#fefefe
| 419591 ||  || — || August 18, 2006 || Palomar || NEAT || — || align=right data-sort-value="0.84" | 840 m || 
|-id=592 bgcolor=#fefefe
| 419592 ||  || — || September 11, 2010 || Kitt Peak || Spacewatch || — || align=right data-sort-value="0.67" | 670 m || 
|-id=593 bgcolor=#fefefe
| 419593 ||  || — || September 11, 2010 || Kitt Peak || Spacewatch || NYS || align=right data-sort-value="0.64" | 640 m || 
|-id=594 bgcolor=#fefefe
| 419594 ||  || — || September 11, 2010 || Kitt Peak || Spacewatch || — || align=right | 1.0 km || 
|-id=595 bgcolor=#fefefe
| 419595 ||  || — || November 20, 2003 || Socorro || LINEAR || — || align=right data-sort-value="0.77" | 770 m || 
|-id=596 bgcolor=#fefefe
| 419596 ||  || — || October 19, 2003 || Apache Point || SDSS || — || align=right data-sort-value="0.71" | 710 m || 
|-id=597 bgcolor=#fefefe
| 419597 ||  || — || September 11, 2010 || Kitt Peak || Spacewatch || V || align=right data-sort-value="0.61" | 610 m || 
|-id=598 bgcolor=#fefefe
| 419598 ||  || — || September 11, 2010 || Catalina || CSS || — || align=right data-sort-value="0.87" | 870 m || 
|-id=599 bgcolor=#fefefe
| 419599 ||  || — || September 11, 2010 || Kitt Peak || Spacewatch || NYS || align=right data-sort-value="0.73" | 730 m || 
|-id=600 bgcolor=#fefefe
| 419600 ||  || — || September 11, 2010 || Kitt Peak || Spacewatch || — || align=right data-sort-value="0.95" | 950 m || 
|}

419601–419700 

|-bgcolor=#fefefe
| 419601 ||  || — || December 19, 2007 || Mount Lemmon || Mount Lemmon Survey || — || align=right data-sort-value="0.95" | 950 m || 
|-id=602 bgcolor=#fefefe
| 419602 ||  || — || September 11, 2010 || Catalina || CSS || — || align=right data-sort-value="0.65" | 650 m || 
|-id=603 bgcolor=#fefefe
| 419603 ||  || — || October 24, 2003 || Kitt Peak || Spacewatch || V || align=right data-sort-value="0.61" | 610 m || 
|-id=604 bgcolor=#fefefe
| 419604 ||  || — || February 19, 2009 || Kitt Peak || Spacewatch || — || align=right data-sort-value="0.80" | 800 m || 
|-id=605 bgcolor=#fefefe
| 419605 ||  || — || November 29, 1999 || Kitt Peak || Spacewatch || MAS || align=right data-sort-value="0.63" | 630 m || 
|-id=606 bgcolor=#fefefe
| 419606 ||  || — || September 14, 2010 || Kitt Peak || Spacewatch || V || align=right data-sort-value="0.59" | 590 m || 
|-id=607 bgcolor=#fefefe
| 419607 ||  || — || August 18, 2006 || Kitt Peak || Spacewatch || — || align=right data-sort-value="0.58" | 580 m || 
|-id=608 bgcolor=#fefefe
| 419608 ||  || — || March 9, 2005 || Kitt Peak || Spacewatch || — || align=right | 1.6 km || 
|-id=609 bgcolor=#fefefe
| 419609 ||  || — || February 8, 2008 || Kitt Peak || Spacewatch || — || align=right data-sort-value="0.72" | 720 m || 
|-id=610 bgcolor=#fefefe
| 419610 ||  || — || March 2, 2009 || Kitt Peak || Spacewatch || — || align=right data-sort-value="0.65" | 650 m || 
|-id=611 bgcolor=#fefefe
| 419611 ||  || — || September 14, 2010 || Kitt Peak || Spacewatch || — || align=right data-sort-value="0.75" | 750 m || 
|-id=612 bgcolor=#fefefe
| 419612 ||  || — || October 20, 2003 || Kitt Peak || Spacewatch || — || align=right data-sort-value="0.58" | 580 m || 
|-id=613 bgcolor=#fefefe
| 419613 ||  || — || September 15, 2010 || Kitt Peak || Spacewatch || — || align=right data-sort-value="0.71" | 710 m || 
|-id=614 bgcolor=#fefefe
| 419614 ||  || — || September 4, 2010 || Kitt Peak || Spacewatch || — || align=right data-sort-value="0.68" | 680 m || 
|-id=615 bgcolor=#fefefe
| 419615 ||  || — || November 7, 2007 || Kitt Peak || Spacewatch || — || align=right data-sort-value="0.82" | 820 m || 
|-id=616 bgcolor=#E9E9E9
| 419616 ||  || — || October 12, 2006 || Kitt Peak || Spacewatch || — || align=right data-sort-value="0.98" | 980 m || 
|-id=617 bgcolor=#fefefe
| 419617 ||  || — || June 3, 2006 || Mount Lemmon || Mount Lemmon Survey || — || align=right data-sort-value="0.74" | 740 m || 
|-id=618 bgcolor=#fefefe
| 419618 ||  || — || September 9, 2010 || Kitt Peak || Spacewatch || — || align=right data-sort-value="0.90" | 900 m || 
|-id=619 bgcolor=#fefefe
| 419619 ||  || — || January 13, 2008 || Mount Lemmon || Mount Lemmon Survey || — || align=right data-sort-value="0.80" | 800 m || 
|-id=620 bgcolor=#fefefe
| 419620 ||  || — || November 7, 2007 || Kitt Peak || Spacewatch || V || align=right data-sort-value="0.67" | 670 m || 
|-id=621 bgcolor=#fefefe
| 419621 ||  || — || December 18, 2007 || Mount Lemmon || Mount Lemmon Survey || V || align=right data-sort-value="0.58" | 580 m || 
|-id=622 bgcolor=#fefefe
| 419622 ||  || — || September 30, 2003 || Kitt Peak || Spacewatch || — || align=right data-sort-value="0.74" | 740 m || 
|-id=623 bgcolor=#fefefe
| 419623 ||  || — || February 12, 2008 || Kitt Peak || Spacewatch || — || align=right data-sort-value="0.66" | 660 m || 
|-id=624 bgcolor=#FFC2E0
| 419624 ||  || — || September 17, 2010 || WISE || WISE || APO || align=right data-sort-value="0.36" | 360 m || 
|-id=625 bgcolor=#fefefe
| 419625 ||  || — || March 11, 2005 || Kitt Peak || Spacewatch || — || align=right data-sort-value="0.86" | 860 m || 
|-id=626 bgcolor=#fefefe
| 419626 ||  || — || October 10, 1999 || Socorro || LINEAR || — || align=right data-sort-value="0.67" | 670 m || 
|-id=627 bgcolor=#fefefe
| 419627 ||  || — || November 23, 2003 || Kitt Peak || Spacewatch || — || align=right data-sort-value="0.64" | 640 m || 
|-id=628 bgcolor=#fefefe
| 419628 ||  || — || September 19, 2010 || Kitt Peak || Spacewatch || — || align=right data-sort-value="0.87" | 870 m || 
|-id=629 bgcolor=#fefefe
| 419629 ||  || — || February 2, 2008 || Mount Lemmon || Mount Lemmon Survey || MAS || align=right data-sort-value="0.82" | 820 m || 
|-id=630 bgcolor=#fefefe
| 419630 ||  || — || February 9, 2008 || Kitt Peak || Spacewatch || — || align=right data-sort-value="0.77" | 770 m || 
|-id=631 bgcolor=#fefefe
| 419631 ||  || — || August 21, 2006 || Kitt Peak || Spacewatch || MAS || align=right data-sort-value="0.72" | 720 m || 
|-id=632 bgcolor=#fefefe
| 419632 ||  || — || November 20, 2003 || Kitt Peak || Spacewatch || V || align=right data-sort-value="0.70" | 700 m || 
|-id=633 bgcolor=#fefefe
| 419633 ||  || — || April 18, 2009 || Mount Lemmon || Mount Lemmon Survey || — || align=right data-sort-value="0.80" | 800 m || 
|-id=634 bgcolor=#fefefe
| 419634 ||  || — || October 26, 1995 || Kitt Peak || Spacewatch || NYS || align=right data-sort-value="0.63" | 630 m || 
|-id=635 bgcolor=#fefefe
| 419635 ||  || — || September 28, 2003 || Kitt Peak || Spacewatch || — || align=right data-sort-value="0.69" | 690 m || 
|-id=636 bgcolor=#fefefe
| 419636 ||  || — || September 15, 2006 || Kitt Peak || Spacewatch || — || align=right data-sort-value="0.78" | 780 m || 
|-id=637 bgcolor=#fefefe
| 419637 ||  || — || January 18, 2008 || Kitt Peak || Spacewatch || — || align=right data-sort-value="0.64" | 640 m || 
|-id=638 bgcolor=#fefefe
| 419638 ||  || — || January 11, 2008 || Kitt Peak || Spacewatch || — || align=right data-sort-value="0.77" | 770 m || 
|-id=639 bgcolor=#fefefe
| 419639 ||  || — || December 5, 2007 || Mount Lemmon || Mount Lemmon Survey || — || align=right data-sort-value="0.97" | 970 m || 
|-id=640 bgcolor=#fefefe
| 419640 ||  || — || January 1, 2008 || Kitt Peak || Spacewatch || NYS || align=right data-sort-value="0.49" | 490 m || 
|-id=641 bgcolor=#fefefe
| 419641 ||  || — || September 19, 2003 || Kitt Peak || Spacewatch || V || align=right data-sort-value="0.65" | 650 m || 
|-id=642 bgcolor=#fefefe
| 419642 ||  || — || November 28, 1999 || Kitt Peak || Spacewatch || — || align=right data-sort-value="0.87" | 870 m || 
|-id=643 bgcolor=#fefefe
| 419643 ||  || — || September 18, 2003 || Kitt Peak || Spacewatch || V || align=right data-sort-value="0.52" | 520 m || 
|-id=644 bgcolor=#fefefe
| 419644 ||  || — || October 22, 1995 || Kitt Peak || Spacewatch || NYS || align=right data-sort-value="0.57" | 570 m || 
|-id=645 bgcolor=#fefefe
| 419645 ||  || — || October 15, 1999 || Kitt Peak || Spacewatch || — || align=right data-sort-value="0.64" | 640 m || 
|-id=646 bgcolor=#fefefe
| 419646 ||  || — || April 28, 2009 || Mount Lemmon || Mount Lemmon Survey || — || align=right data-sort-value="0.89" | 890 m || 
|-id=647 bgcolor=#E9E9E9
| 419647 ||  || — || December 13, 2006 || Catalina || CSS || — || align=right | 1.6 km || 
|-id=648 bgcolor=#fefefe
| 419648 ||  || — || August 17, 2006 || Palomar || NEAT || — || align=right data-sort-value="0.80" | 800 m || 
|-id=649 bgcolor=#fefefe
| 419649 ||  || — || December 31, 2007 || Kitt Peak || Spacewatch || — || align=right data-sort-value="0.72" | 720 m || 
|-id=650 bgcolor=#fefefe
| 419650 ||  || — || March 22, 2009 || Mount Lemmon || Mount Lemmon Survey || — || align=right | 1.0 km || 
|-id=651 bgcolor=#fefefe
| 419651 ||  || — || August 19, 2010 || XuYi || PMO NEO || MAS || align=right data-sort-value="0.71" | 710 m || 
|-id=652 bgcolor=#fefefe
| 419652 ||  || — || August 29, 2006 || Kitt Peak || Spacewatch || — || align=right data-sort-value="0.91" | 910 m || 
|-id=653 bgcolor=#fefefe
| 419653 ||  || — || September 19, 2010 || Kitt Peak || Spacewatch || — || align=right data-sort-value="0.74" | 740 m || 
|-id=654 bgcolor=#fefefe
| 419654 ||  || — || September 30, 2003 || Kitt Peak || Spacewatch || — || align=right data-sort-value="0.63" | 630 m || 
|-id=655 bgcolor=#fefefe
| 419655 ||  || — || February 28, 2008 || Mount Lemmon || Mount Lemmon Survey || — || align=right data-sort-value="0.66" | 660 m || 
|-id=656 bgcolor=#fefefe
| 419656 ||  || — || October 2, 2006 || Mount Lemmon || Mount Lemmon Survey || MAS || align=right data-sort-value="0.79" | 790 m || 
|-id=657 bgcolor=#fefefe
| 419657 ||  || — || March 21, 2009 || Kitt Peak || Spacewatch || — || align=right | 2.0 km || 
|-id=658 bgcolor=#fefefe
| 419658 ||  || — || August 30, 2003 || Kitt Peak || Spacewatch || — || align=right data-sort-value="0.70" | 700 m || 
|-id=659 bgcolor=#fefefe
| 419659 ||  || — || November 10, 1999 || Kitt Peak || Spacewatch || — || align=right data-sort-value="0.75" | 750 m || 
|-id=660 bgcolor=#E9E9E9
| 419660 ||  || — || October 2, 2006 || Kitt Peak || Spacewatch || — || align=right data-sort-value="0.98" | 980 m || 
|-id=661 bgcolor=#fefefe
| 419661 ||  || — || August 23, 2003 || Palomar || NEAT || — || align=right | 1.1 km || 
|-id=662 bgcolor=#fefefe
| 419662 ||  || — || March 24, 2009 || Mount Lemmon || Mount Lemmon Survey || — || align=right data-sort-value="0.85" | 850 m || 
|-id=663 bgcolor=#fefefe
| 419663 ||  || — || September 12, 2010 || Kitt Peak || Spacewatch || V || align=right data-sort-value="0.62" | 620 m || 
|-id=664 bgcolor=#fefefe
| 419664 ||  || — || April 11, 2005 || Mount Lemmon || Mount Lemmon Survey || — || align=right data-sort-value="0.80" | 800 m || 
|-id=665 bgcolor=#E9E9E9
| 419665 ||  || — || October 22, 2006 || Kitt Peak || Spacewatch || — || align=right data-sort-value="0.78" | 780 m || 
|-id=666 bgcolor=#FA8072
| 419666 ||  || — || December 25, 2006 || Catalina || CSS || — || align=right | 1.3 km || 
|-id=667 bgcolor=#fefefe
| 419667 ||  || — || May 18, 2009 || Mount Lemmon || Mount Lemmon Survey || — || align=right data-sort-value="0.87" | 870 m || 
|-id=668 bgcolor=#E9E9E9
| 419668 ||  || — || November 18, 2006 || Mount Lemmon || Mount Lemmon Survey || — || align=right | 1.0 km || 
|-id=669 bgcolor=#fefefe
| 419669 ||  || — || September 30, 2006 || Kitt Peak || Spacewatch || — || align=right | 1.0 km || 
|-id=670 bgcolor=#E9E9E9
| 419670 ||  || — || April 16, 2004 || Kitt Peak || Spacewatch || — || align=right | 1.7 km || 
|-id=671 bgcolor=#E9E9E9
| 419671 ||  || — || March 10, 2007 || Palomar || NEAT || — || align=right | 1.9 km || 
|-id=672 bgcolor=#fefefe
| 419672 ||  || — || August 28, 2006 || Catalina || CSS || MAS || align=right data-sort-value="0.66" | 660 m || 
|-id=673 bgcolor=#fefefe
| 419673 ||  || — || February 12, 2008 || Kitt Peak || Spacewatch || MAS || align=right data-sort-value="0.82" | 820 m || 
|-id=674 bgcolor=#fefefe
| 419674 ||  || — || August 28, 2006 || Kitt Peak || Spacewatch || — || align=right data-sort-value="0.64" | 640 m || 
|-id=675 bgcolor=#fefefe
| 419675 ||  || — || March 5, 2008 || Mount Lemmon || Mount Lemmon Survey || — || align=right data-sort-value="0.72" | 720 m || 
|-id=676 bgcolor=#E9E9E9
| 419676 ||  || — || March 6, 2008 || Mount Lemmon || Mount Lemmon Survey || — || align=right data-sort-value="0.84" | 840 m || 
|-id=677 bgcolor=#fefefe
| 419677 ||  || — || December 17, 2007 || Mount Lemmon || Mount Lemmon Survey || — || align=right data-sort-value="0.84" | 840 m || 
|-id=678 bgcolor=#fefefe
| 419678 ||  || — || October 2, 2010 || Mount Lemmon || Mount Lemmon Survey || V || align=right data-sort-value="0.68" | 680 m || 
|-id=679 bgcolor=#E9E9E9
| 419679 ||  || — || January 20, 2008 || Mount Lemmon || Mount Lemmon Survey || MAR || align=right | 1.2 km || 
|-id=680 bgcolor=#fefefe
| 419680 ||  || — || March 10, 2005 || Mount Lemmon || Mount Lemmon Survey || — || align=right data-sort-value="0.71" | 710 m || 
|-id=681 bgcolor=#fefefe
| 419681 ||  || — || August 27, 2006 || Kitt Peak || Spacewatch || V || align=right data-sort-value="0.56" | 560 m || 
|-id=682 bgcolor=#fefefe
| 419682 ||  || — || May 31, 2006 || Mount Lemmon || Mount Lemmon Survey || — || align=right data-sort-value="0.87" | 870 m || 
|-id=683 bgcolor=#fefefe
| 419683 || 2010 UV || — || August 27, 2006 || Pla D'Arguines || Spacewatch || NYS || align=right data-sort-value="0.59" | 590 m || 
|-id=684 bgcolor=#fefefe
| 419684 ||  || — || February 28, 2008 || Kitt Peak || Spacewatch || — || align=right data-sort-value="0.63" | 630 m || 
|-id=685 bgcolor=#E9E9E9
| 419685 ||  || — || October 17, 2010 || Mount Lemmon || Mount Lemmon Survey || — || align=right | 2.2 km || 
|-id=686 bgcolor=#fefefe
| 419686 ||  || — || August 16, 2006 || Palomar || NEAT || — || align=right data-sort-value="0.81" | 810 m || 
|-id=687 bgcolor=#E9E9E9
| 419687 ||  || — || September 18, 2010 || Mount Lemmon || Mount Lemmon Survey || — || align=right | 1.6 km || 
|-id=688 bgcolor=#fefefe
| 419688 ||  || — || November 16, 2003 || Kitt Peak || Spacewatch || — || align=right data-sort-value="0.77" | 770 m || 
|-id=689 bgcolor=#fefefe
| 419689 ||  || — || October 25, 1995 || Xinglong || SCAP || — || align=right data-sort-value="0.88" | 880 m || 
|-id=690 bgcolor=#fefefe
| 419690 ||  || — || November 24, 2003 || Kitt Peak || Spacewatch || — || align=right data-sort-value="0.89" | 890 m || 
|-id=691 bgcolor=#fefefe
| 419691 ||  || — || December 30, 2007 || Kitt Peak || Spacewatch || — || align=right data-sort-value="0.86" | 860 m || 
|-id=692 bgcolor=#E9E9E9
| 419692 ||  || — || October 29, 2010 || Mount Lemmon || Mount Lemmon Survey || — || align=right | 1.9 km || 
|-id=693 bgcolor=#fefefe
| 419693 ||  || — || August 30, 2006 || Anderson Mesa || LONEOS || MAS || align=right data-sort-value="0.85" | 850 m || 
|-id=694 bgcolor=#E9E9E9
| 419694 ||  || — || June 29, 2005 || Kitt Peak || Spacewatch || — || align=right | 1.2 km || 
|-id=695 bgcolor=#fefefe
| 419695 ||  || — || October 1, 2006 || Kitt Peak || Spacewatch || — || align=right data-sort-value="0.98" | 980 m || 
|-id=696 bgcolor=#fefefe
| 419696 ||  || — || April 20, 2009 || Mount Lemmon || Mount Lemmon Survey || — || align=right | 1.1 km || 
|-id=697 bgcolor=#fefefe
| 419697 ||  || — || March 9, 2008 || Socorro || LINEAR || — || align=right data-sort-value="0.96" | 960 m || 
|-id=698 bgcolor=#E9E9E9
| 419698 ||  || — || March 12, 2008 || Catalina || CSS || — || align=right | 2.0 km || 
|-id=699 bgcolor=#E9E9E9
| 419699 ||  || — || April 5, 2008 || Kitt Peak || Spacewatch || EUN || align=right | 1.1 km || 
|-id=700 bgcolor=#E9E9E9
| 419700 ||  || — || May 15, 2005 || Mount Lemmon || Mount Lemmon Survey || — || align=right | 1.3 km || 
|}

419701–419800 

|-bgcolor=#E9E9E9
| 419701 ||  || — || May 6, 2000 || Kitt Peak || Spacewatch || — || align=right | 1.7 km || 
|-id=702 bgcolor=#E9E9E9
| 419702 ||  || — || February 21, 2007 || Catalina || CSS || — || align=right | 2.4 km || 
|-id=703 bgcolor=#E9E9E9
| 419703 ||  || — || September 11, 2010 || Mount Lemmon || Mount Lemmon Survey || — || align=right | 1.2 km || 
|-id=704 bgcolor=#E9E9E9
| 419704 ||  || — || October 17, 2010 || Mount Lemmon || Mount Lemmon Survey || — || align=right | 1.4 km || 
|-id=705 bgcolor=#E9E9E9
| 419705 ||  || — || October 15, 2001 || Socorro || LINEAR || — || align=right | 2.7 km || 
|-id=706 bgcolor=#fefefe
| 419706 ||  || — || October 22, 2006 || Catalina || CSS || — || align=right | 1.1 km || 
|-id=707 bgcolor=#fefefe
| 419707 ||  || — || October 13, 2010 || Mount Lemmon || Mount Lemmon Survey || — || align=right data-sort-value="0.88" | 880 m || 
|-id=708 bgcolor=#fefefe
| 419708 ||  || — || October 10, 1999 || Socorro || LINEAR || — || align=right | 1.6 km || 
|-id=709 bgcolor=#fefefe
| 419709 ||  || — || August 29, 2006 || Kitt Peak || Spacewatch || — || align=right data-sort-value="0.73" | 730 m || 
|-id=710 bgcolor=#E9E9E9
| 419710 ||  || — || October 30, 2010 || Mount Lemmon || Mount Lemmon Survey || — || align=right data-sort-value="0.90" | 900 m || 
|-id=711 bgcolor=#E9E9E9
| 419711 ||  || — || October 11, 2010 || Mount Lemmon || Mount Lemmon Survey || — || align=right | 1.9 km || 
|-id=712 bgcolor=#fefefe
| 419712 ||  || — || October 30, 2010 || Mount Lemmon || Mount Lemmon Survey || — || align=right | 1.0 km || 
|-id=713 bgcolor=#fefefe
| 419713 ||  || — || March 9, 2008 || Siding Spring || SSS || — || align=right | 2.4 km || 
|-id=714 bgcolor=#E9E9E9
| 419714 ||  || — || September 28, 2006 || Mount Lemmon || Mount Lemmon Survey || (5) || align=right data-sort-value="0.82" | 820 m || 
|-id=715 bgcolor=#fefefe
| 419715 ||  || — || August 28, 2006 || Anderson Mesa || LONEOS || — || align=right data-sort-value="0.91" | 910 m || 
|-id=716 bgcolor=#fefefe
| 419716 ||  || — || October 30, 2002 || Mauna Kea || SDSS || — || align=right data-sort-value="0.68" | 680 m || 
|-id=717 bgcolor=#fefefe
| 419717 ||  || — || October 30, 2010 || Socorro || LINEAR || — || align=right data-sort-value="0.90" | 900 m || 
|-id=718 bgcolor=#fefefe
| 419718 ||  || — || December 5, 2000 || Socorro || LINEAR || — || align=right | 1.4 km || 
|-id=719 bgcolor=#fefefe
| 419719 ||  || — || October 12, 2010 || Mount Lemmon || Mount Lemmon Survey || — || align=right data-sort-value="0.85" | 850 m || 
|-id=720 bgcolor=#E9E9E9
| 419720 ||  || — || April 21, 2003 || Kitt Peak || Spacewatch || (5) || align=right | 1.1 km || 
|-id=721 bgcolor=#E9E9E9
| 419721 ||  || — || September 28, 2006 || Mount Lemmon || Mount Lemmon Survey || — || align=right | 1.1 km || 
|-id=722 bgcolor=#E9E9E9
| 419722 ||  || — || November 14, 1998 || Kitt Peak || Spacewatch || — || align=right data-sort-value="0.82" | 820 m || 
|-id=723 bgcolor=#E9E9E9
| 419723 ||  || — || December 16, 2006 || Mount Lemmon || Mount Lemmon Survey || — || align=right | 1.3 km || 
|-id=724 bgcolor=#fefefe
| 419724 ||  || — || October 21, 2006 || Mount Lemmon || Mount Lemmon Survey || — || align=right data-sort-value="0.74" | 740 m || 
|-id=725 bgcolor=#fefefe
| 419725 ||  || — || September 25, 2006 || Kitt Peak || Spacewatch || NYS || align=right data-sort-value="0.57" | 570 m || 
|-id=726 bgcolor=#fefefe
| 419726 ||  || — || October 2, 2006 || Kitt Peak || Spacewatch || — || align=right data-sort-value="0.57" | 570 m || 
|-id=727 bgcolor=#fefefe
| 419727 ||  || — || December 17, 2003 || Kitt Peak || Spacewatch || NYS || align=right data-sort-value="0.74" | 740 m || 
|-id=728 bgcolor=#E9E9E9
| 419728 ||  || — || October 13, 2010 || Mount Lemmon || Mount Lemmon Survey || — || align=right | 2.3 km || 
|-id=729 bgcolor=#fefefe
| 419729 ||  || — || October 27, 1995 || Kitt Peak || Spacewatch || NYS || align=right data-sort-value="0.77" | 770 m || 
|-id=730 bgcolor=#fefefe
| 419730 ||  || — || October 23, 2006 || Palomar || NEAT || — || align=right | 1.4 km || 
|-id=731 bgcolor=#E9E9E9
| 419731 ||  || — || October 20, 2006 || Mount Lemmon || Mount Lemmon Survey || — || align=right | 1.0 km || 
|-id=732 bgcolor=#E9E9E9
| 419732 ||  || — || February 13, 2004 || Kitt Peak || Spacewatch || — || align=right | 1.2 km || 
|-id=733 bgcolor=#fefefe
| 419733 ||  || — || October 4, 2006 || Mount Lemmon || Mount Lemmon Survey || — || align=right data-sort-value="0.98" | 980 m || 
|-id=734 bgcolor=#E9E9E9
| 419734 ||  || — || January 8, 2007 || Mount Lemmon || Mount Lemmon Survey || MAR || align=right | 1.4 km || 
|-id=735 bgcolor=#E9E9E9
| 419735 ||  || — || December 12, 2006 || Kitt Peak || Spacewatch || — || align=right | 1.2 km || 
|-id=736 bgcolor=#fefefe
| 419736 ||  || — || December 5, 2007 || Kitt Peak || Spacewatch || — || align=right data-sort-value="0.86" | 860 m || 
|-id=737 bgcolor=#fefefe
| 419737 ||  || — || November 26, 2003 || Kitt Peak || Spacewatch || — || align=right data-sort-value="0.86" | 860 m || 
|-id=738 bgcolor=#fefefe
| 419738 ||  || — || August 30, 2006 || Anderson Mesa || LONEOS || — || align=right data-sort-value="0.97" | 970 m || 
|-id=739 bgcolor=#fefefe
| 419739 ||  || — || February 9, 2008 || Mount Lemmon || Mount Lemmon Survey || — || align=right data-sort-value="0.90" | 900 m || 
|-id=740 bgcolor=#fefefe
| 419740 ||  || — || September 16, 2006 || Catalina || CSS || — || align=right data-sort-value="0.82" | 820 m || 
|-id=741 bgcolor=#fefefe
| 419741 ||  || — || March 6, 2008 || Mount Lemmon || Mount Lemmon Survey || — || align=right data-sort-value="0.94" | 940 m || 
|-id=742 bgcolor=#E9E9E9
| 419742 ||  || — || November 3, 2010 || Mount Lemmon || Mount Lemmon Survey || (5) || align=right data-sort-value="0.75" | 750 m || 
|-id=743 bgcolor=#fefefe
| 419743 ||  || — || May 4, 2005 || Mount Lemmon || Mount Lemmon Survey || — || align=right | 1.0 km || 
|-id=744 bgcolor=#fefefe
| 419744 ||  || — || December 15, 1999 || Kitt Peak || Spacewatch || — || align=right data-sort-value="0.76" | 760 m || 
|-id=745 bgcolor=#E9E9E9
| 419745 ||  || — || April 22, 2004 || Kitt Peak || Spacewatch || — || align=right | 1.6 km || 
|-id=746 bgcolor=#E9E9E9
| 419746 ||  || — || November 3, 2010 || Kitt Peak || Spacewatch || — || align=right | 1.1 km || 
|-id=747 bgcolor=#E9E9E9
| 419747 ||  || — || November 5, 2010 || Kitt Peak || Spacewatch || — || align=right data-sort-value="0.79" | 790 m || 
|-id=748 bgcolor=#E9E9E9
| 419748 ||  || — || November 24, 2006 || Kitt Peak || Spacewatch || — || align=right | 1.0 km || 
|-id=749 bgcolor=#E9E9E9
| 419749 ||  || — || December 21, 2006 || Kitt Peak || Spacewatch || — || align=right | 1.4 km || 
|-id=750 bgcolor=#E9E9E9
| 419750 ||  || — || September 28, 2006 || Mount Lemmon || Mount Lemmon Survey || — || align=right data-sort-value="0.59" | 590 m || 
|-id=751 bgcolor=#E9E9E9
| 419751 ||  || — || November 6, 2010 || Kitt Peak || Spacewatch || — || align=right data-sort-value="0.98" | 980 m || 
|-id=752 bgcolor=#E9E9E9
| 419752 ||  || — || November 20, 2006 || Kitt Peak || Spacewatch || — || align=right data-sort-value="0.90" | 900 m || 
|-id=753 bgcolor=#E9E9E9
| 419753 ||  || — || October 29, 2010 || Mount Lemmon || Mount Lemmon Survey || — || align=right | 1.3 km || 
|-id=754 bgcolor=#E9E9E9
| 419754 ||  || — || November 7, 2010 || Mount Lemmon || Mount Lemmon Survey || — || align=right | 2.5 km || 
|-id=755 bgcolor=#fefefe
| 419755 ||  || — || August 29, 2006 || Kitt Peak || Spacewatch || NYS || align=right data-sort-value="0.63" | 630 m || 
|-id=756 bgcolor=#E9E9E9
| 419756 ||  || — || March 17, 2007 || Catalina || CSS || — || align=right | 2.6 km || 
|-id=757 bgcolor=#fefefe
| 419757 ||  || — || October 22, 2006 || Mount Lemmon || Mount Lemmon Survey || — || align=right data-sort-value="0.80" | 800 m || 
|-id=758 bgcolor=#E9E9E9
| 419758 ||  || — || November 16, 2006 || Kitt Peak || Spacewatch || — || align=right data-sort-value="0.75" | 750 m || 
|-id=759 bgcolor=#fefefe
| 419759 ||  || — || September 25, 2006 || Catalina || CSS || — || align=right data-sort-value="0.84" | 840 m || 
|-id=760 bgcolor=#fefefe
| 419760 ||  || — || September 18, 2010 || Mount Lemmon || Mount Lemmon Survey || — || align=right data-sort-value="0.96" | 960 m || 
|-id=761 bgcolor=#E9E9E9
| 419761 ||  || — || September 5, 2010 || Mount Lemmon || Mount Lemmon Survey || (5) || align=right data-sort-value="0.77" | 770 m || 
|-id=762 bgcolor=#fefefe
| 419762 ||  || — || August 28, 2006 || Kitt Peak || Spacewatch || — || align=right data-sort-value="0.69" | 690 m || 
|-id=763 bgcolor=#E9E9E9
| 419763 ||  || — || October 30, 2010 || Kitt Peak || Spacewatch || — || align=right | 1.0 km || 
|-id=764 bgcolor=#fefefe
| 419764 ||  || — || November 8, 2010 || Kitt Peak || Spacewatch || — || align=right data-sort-value="0.98" | 980 m || 
|-id=765 bgcolor=#fefefe
| 419765 ||  || — || February 9, 2008 || Catalina || CSS || — || align=right data-sort-value="0.87" | 870 m || 
|-id=766 bgcolor=#E9E9E9
| 419766 ||  || — || October 11, 2010 || Catalina || CSS || — || align=right data-sort-value="0.76" | 760 m || 
|-id=767 bgcolor=#fefefe
| 419767 ||  || — || October 22, 2003 || Kitt Peak || Spacewatch || — || align=right data-sort-value="0.91" | 910 m || 
|-id=768 bgcolor=#fefefe
| 419768 ||  || — || April 7, 2008 || Mount Lemmon || Mount Lemmon Survey || — || align=right data-sort-value="0.79" | 790 m || 
|-id=769 bgcolor=#E9E9E9
| 419769 ||  || — || October 28, 2010 || Mount Lemmon || Mount Lemmon Survey || — || align=right | 1.5 km || 
|-id=770 bgcolor=#fefefe
| 419770 ||  || — || November 10, 1996 || Kitt Peak || Spacewatch || NYS || align=right data-sort-value="0.69" | 690 m || 
|-id=771 bgcolor=#fefefe
| 419771 ||  || — || September 30, 2006 || Mount Lemmon || Mount Lemmon Survey || — || align=right data-sort-value="0.74" | 740 m || 
|-id=772 bgcolor=#E9E9E9
| 419772 ||  || — || November 16, 2006 || Kitt Peak || Spacewatch || — || align=right | 1.2 km || 
|-id=773 bgcolor=#fefefe
| 419773 ||  || — || November 6, 2010 || Mount Lemmon || Mount Lemmon Survey || — || align=right data-sort-value="0.85" | 850 m || 
|-id=774 bgcolor=#fefefe
| 419774 ||  || — || September 27, 2006 || Mount Lemmon || Mount Lemmon Survey || critical || align=right data-sort-value="0.82" | 820 m || 
|-id=775 bgcolor=#fefefe
| 419775 ||  || — || November 6, 2010 || Mount Lemmon || Mount Lemmon Survey || — || align=right | 1.1 km || 
|-id=776 bgcolor=#fefefe
| 419776 ||  || — || September 11, 2010 || Mount Lemmon || Mount Lemmon Survey || — || align=right data-sort-value="0.87" | 870 m || 
|-id=777 bgcolor=#E9E9E9
| 419777 ||  || — || November 11, 2006 || Kitt Peak || Spacewatch || — || align=right data-sort-value="0.85" | 850 m || 
|-id=778 bgcolor=#E9E9E9
| 419778 ||  || — || October 28, 2010 || Kitt Peak || Spacewatch || (5) || align=right data-sort-value="0.89" | 890 m || 
|-id=779 bgcolor=#E9E9E9
| 419779 ||  || — || February 10, 2008 || Kitt Peak || Spacewatch || — || align=right data-sort-value="0.97" | 970 m || 
|-id=780 bgcolor=#E9E9E9
| 419780 ||  || — || November 10, 2010 || Mount Lemmon || Mount Lemmon Survey || RAF || align=right data-sort-value="0.81" | 810 m || 
|-id=781 bgcolor=#E9E9E9
| 419781 ||  || — || March 15, 2008 || Mount Lemmon || Mount Lemmon Survey || — || align=right data-sort-value="0.72" | 720 m || 
|-id=782 bgcolor=#E9E9E9
| 419782 ||  || — || November 6, 2010 || Kitt Peak || Spacewatch || (5) || align=right data-sort-value="0.79" | 790 m || 
|-id=783 bgcolor=#fefefe
| 419783 ||  || — || September 17, 2006 || Kitt Peak || Spacewatch || V || align=right data-sort-value="0.54" | 540 m || 
|-id=784 bgcolor=#E9E9E9
| 419784 ||  || — || November 5, 2010 || Kitt Peak || Spacewatch || — || align=right data-sort-value="0.93" | 930 m || 
|-id=785 bgcolor=#E9E9E9
| 419785 ||  || — || November 13, 2010 || Mount Lemmon || Mount Lemmon Survey || — || align=right | 2.0 km || 
|-id=786 bgcolor=#E9E9E9
| 419786 ||  || — || December 11, 2006 || Kitt Peak || Spacewatch || — || align=right data-sort-value="0.99" | 990 m || 
|-id=787 bgcolor=#fefefe
| 419787 ||  || — || September 14, 2006 || Catalina || CSS || NYS || align=right data-sort-value="0.71" | 710 m || 
|-id=788 bgcolor=#fefefe
| 419788 ||  || — || August 19, 2006 || Kitt Peak || Spacewatch || — || align=right data-sort-value="0.62" | 620 m || 
|-id=789 bgcolor=#fefefe
| 419789 ||  || — || January 5, 2000 || Kitt Peak || Spacewatch || MAS || align=right data-sort-value="0.62" | 620 m || 
|-id=790 bgcolor=#fefefe
| 419790 ||  || — || August 19, 2002 || Palomar || NEAT || — || align=right | 1.0 km || 
|-id=791 bgcolor=#fefefe
| 419791 ||  || — || March 4, 2005 || Catalina || CSS || — || align=right data-sort-value="0.96" | 960 m || 
|-id=792 bgcolor=#E9E9E9
| 419792 ||  || — || November 19, 2001 || Socorro || LINEAR || — || align=right | 2.5 km || 
|-id=793 bgcolor=#fefefe
| 419793 ||  || — || August 28, 2006 || Kitt Peak || Spacewatch || V || align=right data-sort-value="0.69" | 690 m || 
|-id=794 bgcolor=#fefefe
| 419794 ||  || — || September 12, 2002 || Palomar || NEAT || — || align=right data-sort-value="0.85" | 850 m || 
|-id=795 bgcolor=#fefefe
| 419795 ||  || — || March 16, 2005 || Catalina || CSS || V || align=right data-sort-value="0.73" | 730 m || 
|-id=796 bgcolor=#E9E9E9
| 419796 ||  || — || March 29, 2008 || Kitt Peak || Spacewatch || — || align=right | 1.7 km || 
|-id=797 bgcolor=#E9E9E9
| 419797 ||  || — || September 18, 2010 || Mount Lemmon || Mount Lemmon Survey || — || align=right data-sort-value="0.90" | 900 m || 
|-id=798 bgcolor=#fefefe
| 419798 ||  || — || April 2, 2005 || Catalina || CSS || — || align=right | 1.2 km || 
|-id=799 bgcolor=#fefefe
| 419799 ||  || — || November 14, 2010 || Catalina || CSS || — || align=right data-sort-value="0.78" | 780 m || 
|-id=800 bgcolor=#E9E9E9
| 419800 ||  || — || November 1, 2010 || Kitt Peak || Spacewatch || — || align=right | 1.9 km || 
|}

419801–419900 

|-bgcolor=#fefefe
| 419801 ||  || — || October 20, 1995 || Kitt Peak || Spacewatch || NYS || align=right data-sort-value="0.62" | 620 m || 
|-id=802 bgcolor=#E9E9E9
| 419802 ||  || — || July 29, 2005 || Palomar || NEAT || — || align=right | 1.1 km || 
|-id=803 bgcolor=#fefefe
| 419803 ||  || — || February 12, 2008 || Siding Spring || SSS || — || align=right | 1.5 km || 
|-id=804 bgcolor=#E9E9E9
| 419804 ||  || — || July 28, 2009 || Kitt Peak || Spacewatch || — || align=right | 1.7 km || 
|-id=805 bgcolor=#E9E9E9
| 419805 ||  || — || April 1, 2008 || Kitt Peak || Spacewatch || — || align=right | 2.2 km || 
|-id=806 bgcolor=#E9E9E9
| 419806 ||  || — || September 28, 2006 || Mount Lemmon || Mount Lemmon Survey || — || align=right data-sort-value="0.94" | 940 m || 
|-id=807 bgcolor=#fefefe
| 419807 ||  || — || March 1, 2008 || Mount Lemmon || Mount Lemmon Survey || — || align=right data-sort-value="0.94" | 940 m || 
|-id=808 bgcolor=#E9E9E9
| 419808 ||  || — || October 23, 2006 || Mount Lemmon || Mount Lemmon Survey || — || align=right | 1.2 km || 
|-id=809 bgcolor=#E9E9E9
| 419809 ||  || — || November 16, 2006 || Kitt Peak || Spacewatch || — || align=right data-sort-value="0.91" | 910 m || 
|-id=810 bgcolor=#E9E9E9
| 419810 ||  || — || November 18, 2006 || Mount Lemmon || Mount Lemmon Survey || (5) || align=right | 1.0 km || 
|-id=811 bgcolor=#E9E9E9
| 419811 ||  || — || January 7, 1999 || Kitt Peak || Spacewatch || (5) || align=right data-sort-value="0.76" | 760 m || 
|-id=812 bgcolor=#E9E9E9
| 419812 ||  || — || November 30, 2010 || Mount Lemmon || Mount Lemmon Survey || — || align=right data-sort-value="0.96" | 960 m || 
|-id=813 bgcolor=#E9E9E9
| 419813 ||  || — || November 28, 2010 || Mount Lemmon || Mount Lemmon Survey || — || align=right | 2.8 km || 
|-id=814 bgcolor=#E9E9E9
| 419814 ||  || — || November 10, 2010 || Catalina || CSS || — || align=right | 1.2 km || 
|-id=815 bgcolor=#E9E9E9
| 419815 ||  || — || November 12, 2010 || Kitt Peak || Spacewatch || — || align=right data-sort-value="0.81" | 810 m || 
|-id=816 bgcolor=#E9E9E9
| 419816 ||  || — || November 6, 2010 || Mount Lemmon || Mount Lemmon Survey || — || align=right | 2.2 km || 
|-id=817 bgcolor=#E9E9E9
| 419817 ||  || — || July 3, 2005 || Palomar || NEAT || — || align=right | 1.2 km || 
|-id=818 bgcolor=#fefefe
| 419818 ||  || — || December 9, 2006 || Kitt Peak || Spacewatch || — || align=right | 1.1 km || 
|-id=819 bgcolor=#E9E9E9
| 419819 ||  || — || November 1, 2010 || Kitt Peak || Spacewatch || AGN || align=right | 1.2 km || 
|-id=820 bgcolor=#E9E9E9
| 419820 ||  || — || August 24, 2001 || Anderson Mesa || LONEOS || — || align=right | 1.7 km || 
|-id=821 bgcolor=#E9E9E9
| 419821 ||  || — || November 6, 2010 || Mount Lemmon || Mount Lemmon Survey || KON || align=right | 2.0 km || 
|-id=822 bgcolor=#E9E9E9
| 419822 ||  || — || March 31, 2008 || Mount Lemmon || Mount Lemmon Survey || — || align=right data-sort-value="0.82" | 820 m || 
|-id=823 bgcolor=#E9E9E9
| 419823 ||  || — || January 16, 2007 || Anderson Mesa || LONEOS || — || align=right | 1.1 km || 
|-id=824 bgcolor=#E9E9E9
| 419824 ||  || — || October 31, 2010 || Mount Lemmon || Mount Lemmon Survey || — || align=right | 1.6 km || 
|-id=825 bgcolor=#E9E9E9
| 419825 ||  || — || November 10, 2010 || Mount Lemmon || Mount Lemmon Survey || PAD || align=right | 1.6 km || 
|-id=826 bgcolor=#fefefe
| 419826 ||  || — || October 31, 1999 || Kitt Peak || Spacewatch || NYS || align=right data-sort-value="0.63" | 630 m || 
|-id=827 bgcolor=#E9E9E9
| 419827 ||  || — || October 22, 2006 || Kitt Peak || Spacewatch || — || align=right | 1.4 km || 
|-id=828 bgcolor=#E9E9E9
| 419828 ||  || — || November 28, 2006 || Mount Lemmon || Mount Lemmon Survey || — || align=right | 1.6 km || 
|-id=829 bgcolor=#FFC2E0
| 419829 ||  || — || December 10, 2010 || Socorro || LINEAR || AMO +1km || align=right data-sort-value="0.90" | 900 m || 
|-id=830 bgcolor=#E9E9E9
| 419830 ||  || — || October 7, 2005 || Mount Lemmon || Mount Lemmon Survey || — || align=right | 2.6 km || 
|-id=831 bgcolor=#E9E9E9
| 419831 ||  || — || March 14, 2007 || Anderson Mesa || LONEOS || — || align=right | 1.0 km || 
|-id=832 bgcolor=#E9E9E9
| 419832 ||  || — || December 18, 2001 || Socorro || LINEAR || GEF || align=right | 1.5 km || 
|-id=833 bgcolor=#E9E9E9
| 419833 ||  || — || April 15, 2008 || Mount Lemmon || Mount Lemmon Survey || — || align=right | 1.2 km || 
|-id=834 bgcolor=#E9E9E9
| 419834 ||  || — || April 6, 2008 || Kitt Peak || Spacewatch || — || align=right | 1.3 km || 
|-id=835 bgcolor=#E9E9E9
| 419835 ||  || — || October 28, 2006 || Mount Lemmon || Mount Lemmon Survey || — || align=right | 1.9 km || 
|-id=836 bgcolor=#E9E9E9
| 419836 ||  || — || January 10, 2007 || Kitt Peak || Spacewatch || (5) || align=right data-sort-value="0.77" | 770 m || 
|-id=837 bgcolor=#E9E9E9
| 419837 ||  || — || November 23, 2006 || Mount Lemmon || Mount Lemmon Survey || (5) || align=right data-sort-value="0.87" | 870 m || 
|-id=838 bgcolor=#E9E9E9
| 419838 ||  || — || February 6, 2007 || Kitt Peak || Spacewatch || — || align=right | 1.1 km || 
|-id=839 bgcolor=#E9E9E9
| 419839 ||  || — || September 21, 2001 || Anderson Mesa || LONEOS || — || align=right | 2.0 km || 
|-id=840 bgcolor=#E9E9E9
| 419840 ||  || — || March 20, 2004 || Kitt Peak || Spacewatch || — || align=right | 1.4 km || 
|-id=841 bgcolor=#E9E9E9
| 419841 ||  || — || November 12, 2010 || Kitt Peak || Spacewatch || EUN || align=right | 1.3 km || 
|-id=842 bgcolor=#E9E9E9
| 419842 ||  || — || December 7, 2005 || Kitt Peak || Spacewatch || — || align=right | 2.2 km || 
|-id=843 bgcolor=#E9E9E9
| 419843 ||  || — || December 10, 2010 || Mount Lemmon || Mount Lemmon Survey || — || align=right | 1.8 km || 
|-id=844 bgcolor=#E9E9E9
| 419844 ||  || — || January 17, 2007 || Kitt Peak || Spacewatch || — || align=right data-sort-value="0.78" | 780 m || 
|-id=845 bgcolor=#E9E9E9
| 419845 ||  || — || January 9, 2007 || Kitt Peak || Spacewatch || — || align=right | 1.8 km || 
|-id=846 bgcolor=#E9E9E9
| 419846 ||  || — || December 8, 2010 || Catalina || CSS || — || align=right | 2.1 km || 
|-id=847 bgcolor=#fefefe
| 419847 ||  || — || March 18, 2004 || Socorro || LINEAR || — || align=right | 1.2 km || 
|-id=848 bgcolor=#E9E9E9
| 419848 ||  || — || December 11, 2001 || Socorro || LINEAR || JUN || align=right | 1.0 km || 
|-id=849 bgcolor=#E9E9E9
| 419849 ||  || — || December 5, 2010 || Kitt Peak || Spacewatch || — || align=right | 2.2 km || 
|-id=850 bgcolor=#E9E9E9
| 419850 ||  || — || December 10, 2010 || Mount Lemmon || Mount Lemmon Survey || — || align=right | 2.3 km || 
|-id=851 bgcolor=#fefefe
| 419851 ||  || — || October 12, 2010 || Kitt Peak || Spacewatch || — || align=right data-sort-value="0.86" | 860 m || 
|-id=852 bgcolor=#E9E9E9
| 419852 ||  || — || October 19, 2001 || Palomar || NEAT || — || align=right | 1.4 km || 
|-id=853 bgcolor=#d6d6d6
| 419853 ||  || — || December 25, 2005 || Mount Lemmon || Mount Lemmon Survey || — || align=right | 2.3 km || 
|-id=854 bgcolor=#E9E9E9
| 419854 ||  || — || December 16, 2006 || Kitt Peak || Spacewatch || — || align=right data-sort-value="0.99" | 990 m || 
|-id=855 bgcolor=#E9E9E9
| 419855 ||  || — || December 6, 2010 || Mount Lemmon || Mount Lemmon Survey || — || align=right | 1.2 km || 
|-id=856 bgcolor=#E9E9E9
| 419856 ||  || — || December 13, 2010 || Mount Lemmon || Mount Lemmon Survey || — || align=right | 2.1 km || 
|-id=857 bgcolor=#E9E9E9
| 419857 ||  || — || September 25, 2005 || Palomar || NEAT || — || align=right | 1.8 km || 
|-id=858 bgcolor=#d6d6d6
| 419858 Abecheng ||  ||  || February 1, 2010 || WISE || WISE || — || align=right | 3.4 km || 
|-id=859 bgcolor=#E9E9E9
| 419859 ||  || — || November 27, 2006 || Mount Lemmon || Mount Lemmon Survey || MAR || align=right | 1.0 km || 
|-id=860 bgcolor=#d6d6d6
| 419860 ||  || — || January 31, 2006 || Anderson Mesa || LONEOS || — || align=right | 3.7 km || 
|-id=861 bgcolor=#d6d6d6
| 419861 ||  || — || October 25, 2008 || Kitt Peak || Spacewatch || — || align=right | 3.7 km || 
|-id=862 bgcolor=#E9E9E9
| 419862 ||  || — || December 1, 2010 || Mount Lemmon || Mount Lemmon Survey || — || align=right | 3.7 km || 
|-id=863 bgcolor=#E9E9E9
| 419863 ||  || — || May 3, 2008 || Kitt Peak || Spacewatch || EUN || align=right | 1.5 km || 
|-id=864 bgcolor=#E9E9E9
| 419864 ||  || — || September 26, 2009 || Kitt Peak || Spacewatch || — || align=right | 2.1 km || 
|-id=865 bgcolor=#E9E9E9
| 419865 ||  || — || January 10, 2007 || Kitt Peak || Spacewatch || — || align=right data-sort-value="0.87" | 870 m || 
|-id=866 bgcolor=#E9E9E9
| 419866 ||  || — || February 23, 2007 || Catalina || CSS || EUN || align=right | 1.4 km || 
|-id=867 bgcolor=#E9E9E9
| 419867 ||  || — || November 1, 2005 || Mount Lemmon || Mount Lemmon Survey || — || align=right | 2.2 km || 
|-id=868 bgcolor=#E9E9E9
| 419868 ||  || — || December 27, 2006 || Mount Lemmon || Mount Lemmon Survey || — || align=right | 1.0 km || 
|-id=869 bgcolor=#d6d6d6
| 419869 ||  || — || January 31, 2006 || Catalina || CSS || EOS || align=right | 2.3 km || 
|-id=870 bgcolor=#E9E9E9
| 419870 ||  || — || September 9, 2004 || Kitt Peak || Spacewatch || — || align=right | 2.7 km || 
|-id=871 bgcolor=#E9E9E9
| 419871 ||  || — || November 21, 2006 || Mount Lemmon || Mount Lemmon Survey || — || align=right data-sort-value="0.75" | 750 m || 
|-id=872 bgcolor=#E9E9E9
| 419872 ||  || — || September 26, 2005 || Kitt Peak || Spacewatch || — || align=right | 1.4 km || 
|-id=873 bgcolor=#E9E9E9
| 419873 ||  || — || December 18, 2001 || Socorro || LINEAR || — || align=right | 1.1 km || 
|-id=874 bgcolor=#E9E9E9
| 419874 ||  || — || December 17, 2001 || Socorro || LINEAR || — || align=right | 1.5 km || 
|-id=875 bgcolor=#E9E9E9
| 419875 ||  || — || February 21, 2007 || Mount Lemmon || Mount Lemmon Survey || — || align=right | 1.4 km || 
|-id=876 bgcolor=#E9E9E9
| 419876 ||  || — || August 20, 2009 || Kitt Peak || Spacewatch || — || align=right | 2.2 km || 
|-id=877 bgcolor=#E9E9E9
| 419877 ||  || — || February 17, 2007 || Kitt Peak || Spacewatch || — || align=right | 1.2 km || 
|-id=878 bgcolor=#E9E9E9
| 419878 ||  || — || December 31, 2002 || Socorro || LINEAR || — || align=right | 1.6 km || 
|-id=879 bgcolor=#E9E9E9
| 419879 ||  || — || November 16, 2010 || Mount Lemmon || Mount Lemmon Survey || — || align=right | 2.9 km || 
|-id=880 bgcolor=#FFC2E0
| 419880 ||  || — || January 7, 2011 || WISE || WISE || APOPHA || align=right data-sort-value="0.98" | 980 m || 
|-id=881 bgcolor=#E9E9E9
| 419881 ||  || — || November 22, 2006 || Mount Lemmon || Mount Lemmon Survey || — || align=right data-sort-value="0.94" | 940 m || 
|-id=882 bgcolor=#d6d6d6
| 419882 ||  || — || December 5, 2010 || Mount Lemmon || Mount Lemmon Survey || EOS || align=right | 2.1 km || 
|-id=883 bgcolor=#d6d6d6
| 419883 ||  || — || January 5, 1994 || Kitt Peak || Spacewatch || — || align=right | 4.1 km || 
|-id=884 bgcolor=#E9E9E9
| 419884 ||  || — || March 20, 2007 || Mount Lemmon || Mount Lemmon Survey || — || align=right | 2.0 km || 
|-id=885 bgcolor=#E9E9E9
| 419885 ||  || — || January 28, 2007 || Mount Lemmon || Mount Lemmon Survey || MIS || align=right | 2.0 km || 
|-id=886 bgcolor=#d6d6d6
| 419886 ||  || — || November 3, 2010 || Kitt Peak || Spacewatch || EMA || align=right | 3.5 km || 
|-id=887 bgcolor=#E9E9E9
| 419887 ||  || — || November 11, 2010 || Kitt Peak || Spacewatch || — || align=right | 2.2 km || 
|-id=888 bgcolor=#d6d6d6
| 419888 ||  || — || January 10, 2011 || Kitt Peak || Spacewatch || EOS || align=right | 1.9 km || 
|-id=889 bgcolor=#E9E9E9
| 419889 ||  || — || January 10, 2011 || Kitt Peak || Spacewatch || DOR || align=right | 2.8 km || 
|-id=890 bgcolor=#E9E9E9
| 419890 ||  || — || October 29, 2005 || Mount Lemmon || Mount Lemmon Survey || MIS || align=right | 2.4 km || 
|-id=891 bgcolor=#E9E9E9
| 419891 ||  || — || March 13, 2007 || Catalina || CSS || EUN || align=right | 1.3 km || 
|-id=892 bgcolor=#E9E9E9
| 419892 ||  || — || December 25, 2010 || Mount Lemmon || Mount Lemmon Survey || — || align=right | 1.1 km || 
|-id=893 bgcolor=#fefefe
| 419893 ||  || — || December 6, 2010 || Mount Lemmon || Mount Lemmon Survey || — || align=right data-sort-value="0.87" | 870 m || 
|-id=894 bgcolor=#E9E9E9
| 419894 ||  || — || September 29, 2005 || Mount Lemmon || Mount Lemmon Survey || — || align=right | 1.1 km || 
|-id=895 bgcolor=#E9E9E9
| 419895 ||  || — || February 9, 2007 || Kitt Peak || Spacewatch || — || align=right | 1.2 km || 
|-id=896 bgcolor=#E9E9E9
| 419896 ||  || — || March 10, 2007 || Palomar || NEAT || — || align=right | 1.6 km || 
|-id=897 bgcolor=#E9E9E9
| 419897 ||  || — || October 12, 2005 || Kitt Peak || Spacewatch || — || align=right | 1.1 km || 
|-id=898 bgcolor=#E9E9E9
| 419898 ||  || — || January 17, 2007 || Kitt Peak || Spacewatch || (5) || align=right data-sort-value="0.74" | 740 m || 
|-id=899 bgcolor=#E9E9E9
| 419899 ||  || — || January 14, 2011 || Kitt Peak || Spacewatch || — || align=right | 1.8 km || 
|-id=900 bgcolor=#fefefe
| 419900 ||  || — || November 1, 2006 || Mount Lemmon || Mount Lemmon Survey || — || align=right | 1.2 km || 
|}

419901–420000 

|-bgcolor=#E9E9E9
| 419901 ||  || — || February 21, 2007 || Kitt Peak || Spacewatch || — || align=right | 1.8 km || 
|-id=902 bgcolor=#d6d6d6
| 419902 ||  || — || December 3, 2010 || Mount Lemmon || Mount Lemmon Survey || — || align=right | 2.5 km || 
|-id=903 bgcolor=#E9E9E9
| 419903 ||  || — || July 28, 2008 || Mount Lemmon || Mount Lemmon Survey || — || align=right | 1.5 km || 
|-id=904 bgcolor=#E9E9E9
| 419904 ||  || — || December 21, 2006 || Mount Lemmon || Mount Lemmon Survey || — || align=right | 1.1 km || 
|-id=905 bgcolor=#E9E9E9
| 419905 ||  || — || November 23, 2006 || Mount Lemmon || Mount Lemmon Survey || — || align=right | 2.2 km || 
|-id=906 bgcolor=#E9E9E9
| 419906 ||  || — || January 17, 2007 || Catalina || CSS || — || align=right | 1.6 km || 
|-id=907 bgcolor=#E9E9E9
| 419907 ||  || — || January 27, 2007 || Mount Lemmon || Mount Lemmon Survey || — || align=right | 1.1 km || 
|-id=908 bgcolor=#E9E9E9
| 419908 ||  || — || February 23, 2007 || Kitt Peak || Spacewatch || — || align=right | 1.3 km || 
|-id=909 bgcolor=#E9E9E9
| 419909 ||  || — || October 1, 2005 || Mount Lemmon || Mount Lemmon Survey || MIS || align=right | 2.1 km || 
|-id=910 bgcolor=#d6d6d6
| 419910 ||  || — || December 28, 2005 || Kitt Peak || Spacewatch || — || align=right | 2.4 km || 
|-id=911 bgcolor=#E9E9E9
| 419911 ||  || — || August 28, 2005 || Kitt Peak || Spacewatch || — || align=right data-sort-value="0.86" | 860 m || 
|-id=912 bgcolor=#d6d6d6
| 419912 ||  || — || January 16, 2011 || Mount Lemmon || Mount Lemmon Survey || — || align=right | 2.9 km || 
|-id=913 bgcolor=#E9E9E9
| 419913 ||  || — || January 4, 2006 || Mount Lemmon || Mount Lemmon Survey || — || align=right | 2.3 km || 
|-id=914 bgcolor=#E9E9E9
| 419914 ||  || — || December 1, 2005 || Kitt Peak || Spacewatch || — || align=right | 2.5 km || 
|-id=915 bgcolor=#E9E9E9
| 419915 ||  || — || January 13, 2011 || Kitt Peak || Spacewatch || — || align=right | 2.1 km || 
|-id=916 bgcolor=#d6d6d6
| 419916 ||  || — || January 26, 2010 || WISE || WISE || — || align=right | 2.9 km || 
|-id=917 bgcolor=#E9E9E9
| 419917 ||  || — || October 10, 2005 || Catalina || CSS || ADE || align=right | 2.3 km || 
|-id=918 bgcolor=#E9E9E9
| 419918 ||  || — || September 17, 2009 || Kitt Peak || Spacewatch || HOF || align=right | 2.5 km || 
|-id=919 bgcolor=#d6d6d6
| 419919 ||  || — || November 30, 2005 || Mount Lemmon || Mount Lemmon Survey || — || align=right | 2.1 km || 
|-id=920 bgcolor=#d6d6d6
| 419920 ||  || — || January 23, 2006 || Catalina || CSS || — || align=right | 3.0 km || 
|-id=921 bgcolor=#E9E9E9
| 419921 ||  || — || September 18, 2009 || Kitt Peak || Spacewatch || — || align=right | 1.9 km || 
|-id=922 bgcolor=#FFC2E0
| 419922 ||  || — || September 3, 2010 || Mount Lemmon || Mount Lemmon Survey || APO +1km || align=right | 1.0 km || 
|-id=923 bgcolor=#d6d6d6
| 419923 ||  || — || February 4, 2006 || Mount Lemmon || Mount Lemmon Survey || — || align=right | 2.7 km || 
|-id=924 bgcolor=#E9E9E9
| 419924 ||  || — || December 9, 2010 || Mount Lemmon || Mount Lemmon Survey || — || align=right | 2.5 km || 
|-id=925 bgcolor=#E9E9E9
| 419925 ||  || — || January 11, 2011 || Kitt Peak || Spacewatch || — || align=right | 1.7 km || 
|-id=926 bgcolor=#E9E9E9
| 419926 ||  || — || December 6, 2005 || Kitt Peak || Spacewatch || HOF || align=right | 2.3 km || 
|-id=927 bgcolor=#E9E9E9
| 419927 ||  || — || January 14, 2011 || Kitt Peak || Spacewatch || — || align=right | 1.6 km || 
|-id=928 bgcolor=#E9E9E9
| 419928 ||  || — || October 19, 2006 || Kitt Peak || L. H. Wasserman || — || align=right data-sort-value="0.92" | 920 m || 
|-id=929 bgcolor=#E9E9E9
| 419929 ||  || — || December 26, 2005 || Kitt Peak || Spacewatch || GEF || align=right | 1.5 km || 
|-id=930 bgcolor=#E9E9E9
| 419930 ||  || — || August 29, 2009 || Kitt Peak || Spacewatch || — || align=right | 2.2 km || 
|-id=931 bgcolor=#E9E9E9
| 419931 ||  || — || February 8, 2007 || Palomar || NEAT || — || align=right data-sort-value="0.86" | 860 m || 
|-id=932 bgcolor=#d6d6d6
| 419932 ||  || — || March 25, 2006 || Catalina || CSS || — || align=right | 4.1 km || 
|-id=933 bgcolor=#E9E9E9
| 419933 ||  || — || November 6, 2010 || Kitt Peak || Spacewatch || — || align=right | 1.1 km || 
|-id=934 bgcolor=#E9E9E9
| 419934 ||  || — || February 23, 2007 || Kitt Peak || Spacewatch || — || align=right | 1.2 km || 
|-id=935 bgcolor=#d6d6d6
| 419935 ||  || — || August 23, 2004 || Kitt Peak || Spacewatch || BRA || align=right | 1.3 km || 
|-id=936 bgcolor=#d6d6d6
| 419936 ||  || — || December 29, 2005 || Kitt Peak || Spacewatch || — || align=right | 2.2 km || 
|-id=937 bgcolor=#d6d6d6
| 419937 ||  || — || January 26, 2011 || Mount Lemmon || Mount Lemmon Survey || — || align=right | 2.3 km || 
|-id=938 bgcolor=#E9E9E9
| 419938 ||  || — || January 10, 2011 || Mount Lemmon || Mount Lemmon Survey || — || align=right | 2.1 km || 
|-id=939 bgcolor=#E9E9E9
| 419939 ||  || — || January 17, 2011 || Mount Lemmon || Mount Lemmon Survey ||  || align=right | 2.8 km || 
|-id=940 bgcolor=#E9E9E9
| 419940 ||  || — || November 24, 2006 || Mount Lemmon || Mount Lemmon Survey || — || align=right | 1.1 km || 
|-id=941 bgcolor=#d6d6d6
| 419941 ||  || — || January 11, 2011 || Kitt Peak || Spacewatch || — || align=right | 3.6 km || 
|-id=942 bgcolor=#E9E9E9
| 419942 ||  || — || December 4, 2005 || Kitt Peak || Spacewatch || MRX || align=right | 1.1 km || 
|-id=943 bgcolor=#E9E9E9
| 419943 ||  || — || January 10, 2007 || Kitt Peak || Spacewatch || — || align=right | 1.0 km || 
|-id=944 bgcolor=#d6d6d6
| 419944 ||  || — || January 11, 2011 || Catalina || CSS || — || align=right | 4.3 km || 
|-id=945 bgcolor=#E9E9E9
| 419945 ||  || — || January 11, 2011 || Kitt Peak || Spacewatch || AGN || align=right | 1.4 km || 
|-id=946 bgcolor=#E9E9E9
| 419946 ||  || — || December 8, 2010 || Mount Lemmon || Mount Lemmon Survey || — || align=right | 1.4 km || 
|-id=947 bgcolor=#d6d6d6
| 419947 ||  || — || December 8, 2005 || Kitt Peak || Spacewatch || — || align=right | 5.4 km || 
|-id=948 bgcolor=#E9E9E9
| 419948 ||  || — || March 15, 2007 || Kitt Peak || Spacewatch || — || align=right | 1.9 km || 
|-id=949 bgcolor=#d6d6d6
| 419949 ||  || — || January 16, 2011 || Mount Lemmon || Mount Lemmon Survey || EOS || align=right | 2.0 km || 
|-id=950 bgcolor=#E9E9E9
| 419950 ||  || — || February 17, 2007 || Kitt Peak || Spacewatch || (5) || align=right data-sort-value="0.87" | 870 m || 
|-id=951 bgcolor=#E9E9E9
| 419951 ||  || — || October 15, 2009 || Mount Lemmon || Mount Lemmon Survey || — || align=right | 1.7 km || 
|-id=952 bgcolor=#E9E9E9
| 419952 ||  || — || November 5, 2010 || Mount Lemmon || Mount Lemmon Survey || — || align=right | 2.1 km || 
|-id=953 bgcolor=#E9E9E9
| 419953 ||  || — || January 24, 2007 || Kitt Peak || Spacewatch || — || align=right data-sort-value="0.82" | 820 m || 
|-id=954 bgcolor=#d6d6d6
| 419954 ||  || — || February 5, 2000 || Kitt Peak || Spacewatch || URS || align=right | 3.4 km || 
|-id=955 bgcolor=#E9E9E9
| 419955 ||  || — || September 9, 2008 || Mount Lemmon || Mount Lemmon Survey || — || align=right | 2.4 km || 
|-id=956 bgcolor=#E9E9E9
| 419956 ||  || — || October 28, 2005 || Kitt Peak || Spacewatch || — || align=right | 1.6 km || 
|-id=957 bgcolor=#d6d6d6
| 419957 ||  || — || February 16, 2010 || WISE || WISE || — || align=right | 4.1 km || 
|-id=958 bgcolor=#E9E9E9
| 419958 ||  || — || March 13, 2007 || Catalina || CSS || — || align=right | 1.1 km || 
|-id=959 bgcolor=#d6d6d6
| 419959 ||  || — || December 10, 2004 || Kitt Peak || Spacewatch || EOS || align=right | 2.2 km || 
|-id=960 bgcolor=#d6d6d6
| 419960 ||  || — || March 1, 2010 || WISE || WISE || — || align=right | 3.4 km || 
|-id=961 bgcolor=#E9E9E9
| 419961 ||  || — || January 27, 2007 || Kitt Peak || Spacewatch || — || align=right | 1.2 km || 
|-id=962 bgcolor=#d6d6d6
| 419962 ||  || — || October 14, 2010 || Mount Lemmon || Mount Lemmon Survey || — || align=right | 3.2 km || 
|-id=963 bgcolor=#d6d6d6
| 419963 ||  || — || October 26, 2009 || Kitt Peak || Spacewatch || — || align=right | 2.3 km || 
|-id=964 bgcolor=#E9E9E9
| 419964 ||  || — || December 6, 2010 || Mount Lemmon || Mount Lemmon Survey || — || align=right | 1.3 km || 
|-id=965 bgcolor=#d6d6d6
| 419965 ||  || — || December 30, 2005 || Mount Lemmon || Mount Lemmon Survey || — || align=right | 2.8 km || 
|-id=966 bgcolor=#d6d6d6
| 419966 ||  || — || January 23, 2006 || Kitt Peak || Spacewatch || — || align=right | 2.7 km || 
|-id=967 bgcolor=#d6d6d6
| 419967 ||  || — || January 27, 2011 || Kitt Peak || Spacewatch || — || align=right | 4.1 km || 
|-id=968 bgcolor=#d6d6d6
| 419968 ||  || — || October 22, 2009 || Mount Lemmon || Mount Lemmon Survey || — || align=right | 2.8 km || 
|-id=969 bgcolor=#E9E9E9
| 419969 ||  || — || December 4, 2005 || Kitt Peak || Spacewatch || AGN || align=right | 1.1 km || 
|-id=970 bgcolor=#d6d6d6
| 419970 ||  || — || December 2, 2010 || Mount Lemmon || Mount Lemmon Survey || EOS || align=right | 2.7 km || 
|-id=971 bgcolor=#E9E9E9
| 419971 ||  || — || January 21, 2002 || Kitt Peak || Spacewatch || — || align=right | 2.2 km || 
|-id=972 bgcolor=#E9E9E9
| 419972 ||  || — || March 12, 2007 || Kitt Peak || Spacewatch || — || align=right | 2.2 km || 
|-id=973 bgcolor=#d6d6d6
| 419973 ||  || — || September 12, 2009 || Kitt Peak || Spacewatch || — || align=right | 2.1 km || 
|-id=974 bgcolor=#d6d6d6
| 419974 ||  || — || December 7, 1999 || Kitt Peak || Spacewatch || — || align=right | 3.1 km || 
|-id=975 bgcolor=#d6d6d6
| 419975 ||  || — || September 21, 2003 || Anderson Mesa || LONEOS || EOS || align=right | 2.8 km || 
|-id=976 bgcolor=#E9E9E9
| 419976 ||  || — || February 27, 2007 || Kitt Peak || Spacewatch || (5) || align=right data-sort-value="0.77" | 770 m || 
|-id=977 bgcolor=#E9E9E9
| 419977 ||  || — || February 21, 2007 || Kitt Peak || Spacewatch || — || align=right | 1.5 km || 
|-id=978 bgcolor=#E9E9E9
| 419978 ||  || — || January 14, 2011 || Kitt Peak || Spacewatch || — || align=right | 2.5 km || 
|-id=979 bgcolor=#E9E9E9
| 419979 ||  || — || January 11, 2011 || Kitt Peak || Spacewatch || — || align=right | 2.4 km || 
|-id=980 bgcolor=#E9E9E9
| 419980 ||  || — || September 20, 2001 || Socorro || LINEAR || — || align=right data-sort-value="0.86" | 860 m || 
|-id=981 bgcolor=#E9E9E9
| 419981 ||  || — || March 16, 2007 || Mount Lemmon || Mount Lemmon Survey || — || align=right | 2.2 km || 
|-id=982 bgcolor=#E9E9E9
| 419982 ||  || — || September 19, 2009 || Mount Lemmon || Mount Lemmon Survey || — || align=right | 1.0 km || 
|-id=983 bgcolor=#E9E9E9
| 419983 ||  || — || March 19, 2007 || Mount Lemmon || Mount Lemmon Survey || — || align=right | 2.0 km || 
|-id=984 bgcolor=#E9E9E9
| 419984 ||  || — || January 9, 1997 || Kitt Peak || Spacewatch || MRX || align=right data-sort-value="0.92" | 920 m || 
|-id=985 bgcolor=#E9E9E9
| 419985 ||  || — || February 10, 2002 || Socorro || LINEAR || — || align=right | 1.6 km || 
|-id=986 bgcolor=#E9E9E9
| 419986 ||  || — || December 7, 2005 || Kitt Peak || Spacewatch || AGN || align=right | 1.4 km || 
|-id=987 bgcolor=#E9E9E9
| 419987 ||  || — || February 10, 2002 || Socorro || LINEAR || — || align=right | 2.0 km || 
|-id=988 bgcolor=#E9E9E9
| 419988 ||  || — || December 2, 2005 || Kitt Peak || Spacewatch || — || align=right | 1.7 km || 
|-id=989 bgcolor=#E9E9E9
| 419989 ||  || — || January 30, 2011 || Mount Lemmon || Mount Lemmon Survey || — || align=right | 1.1 km || 
|-id=990 bgcolor=#E9E9E9
| 419990 ||  || — || September 14, 2009 || Catalina || CSS || — || align=right | 1.8 km || 
|-id=991 bgcolor=#d6d6d6
| 419991 ||  || — || April 20, 2007 || Kitt Peak || Spacewatch || KOR || align=right | 1.1 km || 
|-id=992 bgcolor=#E9E9E9
| 419992 ||  || — || January 14, 2011 || Kitt Peak || Spacewatch || — || align=right | 1.9 km || 
|-id=993 bgcolor=#d6d6d6
| 419993 ||  || — || November 16, 2010 || Mount Lemmon || Mount Lemmon Survey || — || align=right | 3.6 km || 
|-id=994 bgcolor=#d6d6d6
| 419994 ||  || — || January 27, 2011 || Mount Lemmon || Mount Lemmon Survey || — || align=right | 2.4 km || 
|-id=995 bgcolor=#d6d6d6
| 419995 ||  || — || February 5, 2000 || Kitt Peak || M. W. Buie || VER || align=right | 2.8 km || 
|-id=996 bgcolor=#E9E9E9
| 419996 ||  || — || December 4, 2005 || Kitt Peak || Spacewatch || AGN || align=right | 1.0 km || 
|-id=997 bgcolor=#E9E9E9
| 419997 ||  || — || December 24, 2005 || Kitt Peak || Spacewatch || — || align=right | 1.8 km || 
|-id=998 bgcolor=#d6d6d6
| 419998 ||  || — || January 11, 2011 || Kitt Peak || Spacewatch || EOS || align=right | 1.8 km || 
|-id=999 bgcolor=#E9E9E9
| 419999 ||  || — || December 5, 2005 || Kitt Peak || Spacewatch || — || align=right | 2.4 km || 
|-id=000 bgcolor=#E9E9E9
| 420000 ||  || — || May 1, 2003 || Kitt Peak || Spacewatch || — || align=right | 1.7 km || 
|}

References

External links 
 Discovery Circumstances: Numbered Minor Planets (415001)–(420000) (IAU Minor Planet Center)

0419